This page lists all described genera and species of the spider family Oonopidae. , the World Spider Catalog accepts 1874 species in 115 genera:

A

Amazoonops

Amazoonops Ott, Ruiz, Brescovit & Bonaldo, 2017
 Amazoonops almeirim Ott, Ruiz, Brescovit & Bonaldo, 2017 — Brazil
 Amazoonops cachimbo Ott, Ruiz, Brescovit & Bonaldo, 2017 — Brazil
 Amazoonops caxiuana Ott, Ruiz, Brescovit & Bonaldo, 2017 (type) — Brazil
 Amazoonops ducke Ott, Ruiz, Brescovit & Bonaldo, 2017 — Brazil
 Amazoonops juruti Ott, Ruiz, Brescovit & Bonaldo, 2017 — Brazil

Anophthalmoonops

Anophthalmoonops Benoit, 1976
 Anophthalmoonops thoracotermitis Benoit, 1976 (type) — Angola

Antoonops

Antoonops Fannes & Jocqué, 2008
 Antoonops bouaflensis Fannes & Jocqué, 2008 — Ivory Coast
 Antoonops corbulo Fannes & Jocqué, 2008 (type) — Ivory Coast, Ghana
 Antoonops iita Fannes & Jocqué, 2008 — Nigeria
 Antoonops kamieli Fannes, 2013 — Ivory Coast
 Antoonops nebula Fannes & Jocqué, 2008 — Ghana
 Antoonops sarae Fannes, 2013 — Cameroon

Aposphragisma

Aposphragisma Thoma, 2014
 Aposphragisma baltenspergerae Thoma, 2014 — Borneo
 Aposphragisma borgulai Thoma, 2014 — Indonesia (Sumatra)
 Aposphragisma brunomanseri Thoma, 2014 — Borneo
 Aposphragisma confluens Thoma, 2014 — Borneo
 Aposphragisma dayak Thoma, 2014 — Borneo
 Aposphragisma dentatum Thoma, 2014 — Borneo
 Aposphragisma draconigenum Thoma, 2014 — Malaysia
 Aposphragisma globosum Fardiansah & Dupérré, 2018 — Indonesia (Sumatra)
 Aposphragisma hausammannae Thoma, 2014 — Vietnam
 Aposphragisma helvetiorum Thoma, 2014 (type) — Borneo
 Aposphragisma jambi Fardiansah & Dupérré, 2018 — Indonesia (Sumatra)
 Aposphragisma kolleri Thoma, 2014 — Borneo
 Aposphragisma menzi Thoma, 2014 — Borneo
 Aposphragisma monoceros Thoma, 2014 — Borneo
 Aposphragisma nocturnum Thoma, 2014 — Borneo
 Aposphragisma retifer Thoma, 2014 — Borneo
 Aposphragisma rimba Thoma, 2014 — Borneo
 Aposphragisma salewskii Thoma, 2014 — Malaysia, Singapore
 Aposphragisma scimitar Thoma, 2014 — Borneo
 Aposphragisma sepilok Thoma, 2014 — Borneo
 Aposphragisma stannum Thoma, 2014 — Singapore
 Aposphragisma sumatra Fardiansah & Dupérré, 2018 — Indonesia (Sumatra)

Aprusia

Aprusia Simon, 1893
 Aprusia kataragama Grismado & Deeleman, 2011 — Sri Lanka
 Aprusia kerala Grismado & Deeleman, 2011 — India
 Aprusia koslandensis Ranasinghe & Benjamin, 2018 — Sri Lanka
 Aprusia rawanaellensis Ranasinghe & Benjamin, 2018 — Sri Lanka
 Aprusia strenuus Simon, 1893 (type) — Sri Lanka
 Aprusia vankhedei Ranasinghe & Benjamin, 2018 — Sri Lanka
 Aprusia veddah Grismado & Deeleman, 2011 — Sri Lanka
 Aprusia vestigator (Simon, 1893) — Sri Lanka

Aschnaoonops

Aschnaoonops Makhan & Ezzatpanah, 2011
 Aschnaoonops alban Platnick, Dupérré, Berniker & Bonaldo, 2013 — Colombia
 Aschnaoonops aquada Platnick, Dupérré, Berniker & Bonaldo, 2013 — Venezuela
 Aschnaoonops aschnae Makhan & Ezzatpanah, 2011 (type) — Suriname
 Aschnaoonops belem Platnick, Dupérré, Berniker & Bonaldo, 2013 — Brazil
 Aschnaoonops bocono Platnick, Dupérré, Berniker & Bonaldo, 2013 — Venezuela
 Aschnaoonops caninde Platnick, Dupérré, Berniker & Bonaldo, 2013 — Brazil
 Aschnaoonops chingaza Platnick, Dupérré, Berniker & Bonaldo, 2013 — Colombia
 Aschnaoonops chorro Platnick, Dupérré, Berniker & Bonaldo, 2013 — Venezuela
 Aschnaoonops cosanga Platnick, Dupérré, Berniker & Bonaldo, 2013 — Ecuador
 Aschnaoonops cristalina Platnick, Dupérré, Berniker & Bonaldo, 2013 — Venezuela
 Aschnaoonops gorda Platnick, Dupérré, Berniker & Bonaldo, 2013 — Virgin Is.
 Aschnaoonops huila Platnick, Dupérré, Berniker & Bonaldo, 2013 — Colombia
 Aschnaoonops indio Platnick, Dupérré, Berniker & Bonaldo, 2013 — Venezuela
 Aschnaoonops jaji Platnick, Dupérré, Berniker & Bonaldo, 2013 — Venezuela
 Aschnaoonops jatun Platnick, Dupérré, Berniker & Bonaldo, 2013 — Ecuador
 Aschnaoonops leticia Platnick, Dupérré, Berniker & Bonaldo, 2013 — Colombia
 Aschnaoonops malkini Platnick, Dupérré, Berniker & Bonaldo, 2013 — Brazil
 Aschnaoonops margaretae Platnick, Dupérré, Berniker & Bonaldo, 2013 — Venezuela
 Aschnaoonops marshalli Platnick, Dupérré, Berniker & Bonaldo, 2013 — Ecuador
 Aschnaoonops marta Platnick, Dupérré, Berniker & Bonaldo, 2013 — Colombia
 Aschnaoonops masneri Platnick, Dupérré, Berniker & Bonaldo, 2013 — Venezuela
 Aschnaoonops merida Platnick, Dupérré, Berniker & Bonaldo, 2013 — Venezuela
 Aschnaoonops meta Platnick, Dupérré, Berniker & Bonaldo, 2013 — Colombia
 Aschnaoonops orito Platnick, Dupérré, Berniker & Bonaldo, 2013 — Colombia
 Aschnaoonops paez Platnick, Dupérré, Berniker & Bonaldo, 2013 — Colombia
 Aschnaoonops pamplona Platnick, Dupérré, Berniker & Bonaldo, 2013 — Colombia
 Aschnaoonops pedro Platnick, Dupérré, Berniker & Bonaldo, 2013 — Colombia
 Aschnaoonops pira Platnick, Dupérré, Berniker & Bonaldo, 2013 — Colombia
 Aschnaoonops propinquus (Keyserling, 1881) — Colombia
 Aschnaoonops ramirezi Platnick, Dupérré, Berniker & Bonaldo, 2013 — Ecuador
 Aschnaoonops silvae Platnick, Dupérré, Berniker & Bonaldo, 2013 — Colombia, Ecuador, Peru
 Aschnaoonops similis (Keyserling, 1881) — Colombia
 Aschnaoonops simla (Chickering, 1968) — Trinidad
 Aschnaoonops simoni Platnick, Dupérré, Berniker & Bonaldo, 2013 — Venezuela
 Aschnaoonops tachira Platnick, Dupérré, Berniker & Bonaldo, 2013 — Venezuela
 Aschnaoonops tariba Platnick, Dupérré, Berniker & Bonaldo, 2013 — Venezuela
 Aschnaoonops teleferico Platnick, Dupérré, Berniker & Bonaldo, 2013 — Venezuela
 Aschnaoonops tiputini Platnick, Dupérré, Berniker & Bonaldo, 2013 — Ecuador
 Aschnaoonops trujillo Platnick, Dupérré, Berniker & Bonaldo, 2013 — Venezuela
 Aschnaoonops villalba Platnick, Dupérré, Berniker & Bonaldo, 2013 — Puerto Rico
 Aschnaoonops yasuni Platnick, Dupérré, Berniker & Bonaldo, 2013 — Ecuador

Australoonops

Australoonops Hewitt, 1915
 Australoonops granulatus Hewitt, 1915 (type) — South Africa
 Australoonops haddadi Platnick & Dupérré, 2010 — South Africa, Mozambique
 Australoonops skaife Platnick & Dupérré, 2010 — South Africa

B

Bannana

Bannana Tong & Li, 2015
 Bannana crassispina Tong & Li, 2015 (type) — China
 Bannana parvula Tong & Li, 2015 — China

Bidysderina

Bidysderina Platnick, Dupérré, Berniker & Bonaldo, 2013
 Bidysderina bififa Platnick, Dupérré, Berniker & Bonaldo, 2013 — Ecuador
 Bidysderina cayambe Platnick, Dupérré, Berniker & Bonaldo, 2013 — Ecuador
 Bidysderina niarchos Platnick, Dupérré, Berniker & Bonaldo, 2013 — Ecuador
 Bidysderina perdido Platnick, Dupérré, Berniker & Bonaldo, 2013 (type) — Ecuador
 Bidysderina wagra Platnick, Dupérré, Berniker & Bonaldo, 2013 — Ecuador

Bipoonops

Bipoonops Bolzern, 2014
 Bipoonops baobab Bolzern, 2014 — Ecuador
 Bipoonops lansa Dupérré & Tapia, 2017 — Ecuador
 Bipoonops pilan Dupérré & Tapia, 2017 — Ecuador
 Bipoonops pucuna Bolzern, 2014 (type) — Ecuador
 Bipoonops tsachila Bolzern, 2014 — Ecuador

Birabenella

Birabenella Grismado, 2010
 Birabenella argentina (Birabén, 1955) — Argentina
 Birabenella chincha Piacentini, Grismado & Ramírez, 2017 — Peru
 Birabenella elqui Grismado, 2010 — Chile
 Birabenella homonota Grismado, 2010 (type) — Chile
 Birabenella kamanchaca Piacentini, Grismado & Ramírez, 2017 — Chile
 Birabenella pizarroi Grismado, 2010 — Chile
 Birabenella portai Piacentini, Grismado & Ramírez, 2017 — Argentina

Blanioonops

Blanioonops Simon & Fage, 1922
 Blanioonops patellaris Simon & Fage, 1922 (type) — East Africa

Brignolia

Brignolia Dumitrescu & Georgescu, 1983
 Brignolia ambigua (Simon, 1893) — Sri Lanka
 Brignolia ankhu Platnick, Dupérré, Ott & Kranz-Baltensperger, 2011 — Nepal
 Brignolia assam Platnick, Dupérré, Ott & Kranz-Baltensperger, 2011 — India, Nepal
 Brignolia bengal Platnick, Dupérré, Ott & Kranz-Baltensperger, 2011 — India
 Brignolia bowleri (Saaristo, 2002) — Seychelles
 Brignolia cardamom Platnick, Dupérré, Ott & Kranz-Baltensperger, 2011 — India
 Brignolia carlmulleri Ranasinghe & Benjamin, 2016 — Sri Lanka
 Brignolia chumphae Platnick, Dupérré, Ott & Kranz-Baltensperger, 2011 — Thailand
 Brignolia cobre Platnick, Dupérré, Ott & Kranz-Baltensperger, 2011 — USA, Caribbean
 Brignolia dasysterna Platnick, Dupérré, Ott & Kranz-Baltensperger, 2011 — USA
 Brignolia diablo Platnick, Dupérré, Ott & Kranz-Baltensperger, 2011 — Thailand
 Brignolia elongata Platnick, Dupérré, Ott & Kranz-Baltensperger, 2011 — Borneo
 Brignolia gading Platnick, Dupérré, Ott & Kranz-Baltensperger, 2011 — Borneo
 Brignolia jog Platnick, Dupérré, Ott & Kranz-Baltensperger, 2011 — India
 Brignolia kaikatty Platnick, Dupérré, Ott & Kranz-Baltensperger, 2011 — India
 Brignolia kapit Platnick, Dupérré, Ott & Kranz-Baltensperger, 2011 — Borneo
 Brignolia karnataka Platnick, Dupérré, Ott & Kranz-Baltensperger, 2011 — India
 Brignolia kodaik Platnick, Dupérré, Ott & Kranz-Baltensperger, 2011 — India
 Brignolia kumily Platnick, Dupérré, Ott & Kranz-Baltensperger, 2011 — India
 Brignolia mapha Platnick, Dupérré, Ott & Kranz-Baltensperger, 2011 — Thailand
 Brignolia meemure Ranasinghe & Benjamin, 2016 — Sri Lanka
 Brignolia nigripalpis (Simon, 1893) — India, Sri Lanka
 Brignolia nilgiri Platnick, Dupérré, Ott & Kranz-Baltensperger, 2011 — India
 Brignolia ondaatjei Ranasinghe & Benjamin, 2016 — Sri Lanka
 Brignolia palawan Platnick, Dupérré, Ott & Kranz-Baltensperger, 2011 — Philippines
 Brignolia parumpunctata (Simon, 1893) (type) — North, Central, South America. Introduced to Gambia, Sierra Leone, Seychelles, Yemen, Pakistan, India, Sri Lanka, Philippines, Indonesia (Sulawesi, Banda Is.), Australia (Queensland), Pacific Is.,
 Brignolia ratnapura Platnick, Dupérré, Ott & Kranz-Baltensperger, 2011 — Sri Lanka
 Brignolia rothorum Platnick, Dupérré, Ott & Kranz-Baltensperger, 2011 — India
 Brignolia schwendingeri Platnick, Dupérré, Ott & Kranz-Baltensperger, 2011 — Vietnam
 Brignolia shyami Ranasinghe & Benjamin, 2016 — Sri Lanka
 Brignolia sinharaja Platnick, Dupérré, Ott & Kranz-Baltensperger, 2011 — Sri Lanka
 Brignolia sukna Platnick, Dupérré, Ott & Kranz-Baltensperger, 2011 — Nepal
 Brignolia suthep Platnick, Dupérré, Ott & Kranz-Baltensperger, 2011 — Thailand
 Brignolia trichinalis (Benoit, 1979) — Mauritius, Seychelles, Sri Lanka
 Brignolia valparai Platnick, Dupérré, Ott & Kranz-Baltensperger, 2011 — India

C

Caecoonops

Caecoonops Benoit, 1964
 Caecoonops apicotermitis Benoit, 1964 — Congo
 Caecoonops cubitermitis Benoit, 1964 (type) — Congo

Camptoscaphiella

Camptoscaphiella Caporiacco, 1934
 Camptoscaphiella fulva Caporiacco, 1934 (type) — Pakistan, India
 Camptoscaphiella glenniei (Fage, 1946) — India
 Camptoscaphiella gunsa Baehr, 2010 — India, Nepal
 Camptoscaphiella hilaris Brignoli, 1978 — Bhutan
 Camptoscaphiella loebli Baehr, 2010 — India
 Camptoscaphiella martensi Baehr, 2010 — Nepal
 Camptoscaphiella monteithi Baehr & Harvey, 2013 — New Caledonia
 Camptoscaphiella nepalensis Baehr, 2010 — Nepal
 Camptoscaphiella panchthar Baehr, 2010 — Nepal
 Camptoscaphiella paquini Ubick, 2010 — China
 Camptoscaphiella potteri Baehr & Harvey, 2013 — New Caledonia
 Camptoscaphiella schwendingeri Baehr, 2010 — Thailand
 Camptoscaphiella silens Brignoli, 1976 — Nepal
 Camptoscaphiella simoni Baehr, 2010 — Sri Lanka
 Camptoscaphiella sinensis Deeleman-Reinhold, 1995 — China
 Camptoscaphiella strepens Brignoli, 1976 — Nepal
 Camptoscaphiella taplejung Baehr, 2010 — Nepal
 Camptoscaphiella tuberans Tong & Li, 2007 — China

Cavisternum

Cavisternum Baehr, Harvey & Smith, 2010
 Cavisternum attenboroughi Baehr & Raven, 2013 — Australia (Northern Territory)
 Cavisternum bagleyae Baehr, Harvey & Smith, 2010 — Australia (Queensland)
 Cavisternum barthorum Baehr, Harvey & Smith, 2010 — Australia (Queensland)
 Cavisternum bertmaini Baehr, Harvey & Smith, 2010 — Australia (Western Australia)
 Cavisternum bom Ranasinghe & Benjamin, 2018 — Sri Lanka
 Cavisternum carae Baehr, Harvey & Smith, 2010 — Australia (Northern Territory)
 Cavisternum clavatum Baehr, Harvey & Smith, 2010 (type) — Australia (Western Australia)
 Cavisternum digweedi Baehr, Harvey & Smith, 2010 — Australia (Northern Territory)
 Cavisternum ewani Baehr, Harvey & Smith, 2010 — Australia (Queensland)
 Cavisternum federicae Baehr & Harvey, 2010 — Australia (Queensland)
 Cavisternum foxae Baehr, Harvey & Smith, 2010 — Australia (Queensland)
 Cavisternum gatangel Baehr, Harvey & Smith, 2010 — Australia (Queensland)
 Cavisternum gillespieae Harvey & Baehr, 2013 — Australia (Northern Territory)
 Cavisternum heywoodi Baehr, Harvey & Smith, 2010 — Australia (Queensland)
 Cavisternum hughesi Baehr, Harvey & Smith, 2010 — Australia (Queensland)
 Cavisternum ledereri Baehr, Harvey & Smith, 2010 — Australia (Queensland)
 Cavisternum leichhardti Harvey & Baehr, 2013 — Australia (Northern Territory)
 Cavisternum maxmoormanni Baehr, Harvey & Smith, 2010 — Australia (Northern Territory)
 Cavisternum mayorum Baehr, Harvey & Smith, 2010 — Australia (Queensland)
 Cavisternum michaelbellomoi Baehr, Harvey & Smith, 2010 — Australia (Queensland)
 Cavisternum monteithi Baehr & Harvey, 2010 — Australia (Queensland)
 Cavisternum noelashepherdae Baehr, Harvey & Smith, 2010 — Australia (Northern Territory)
 Cavisternum rochesterae Baehr, Harvey & Smith, 2010 — Australia (Queensland)
 Cavisternum toadshow Baehr, Harvey & Smith, 2010 — Australia (Queensland)
 Cavisternum waldockae Baehr, Harvey & Smith, 2010 — Australia (Western Australia)

Cortestina

Cortestina Knoflach, 2009
 Cortestina thaleri Knoflach, 2009 (type) — Austria, Italy

Costarina

Costarina Platnick & Dupérré, 2011
 Costarina abdita (Chickering, 1968) — Panama
 Costarina aguirre Platnick & Berniker, 2014 — Costa Rica
 Costarina almirante Platnick & Berniker, 2014 — Panama
 Costarina alturas Platnick & Berniker, 2014 — Costa Rica
 Costarina anchicaya Platnick & Berniker, 2014 — Colombia
 Costarina antonio Platnick & Berniker, 2014 — Colombia
 Costarina azul Platnick & Berniker, 2014 — Costa Rica
 Costarina barbilla Platnick & Berniker, 2014 — Costa Rica
 Costarina belmopan Platnick & Dupérré, 2012 — Belize, Guatemala
 Costarina blanco Platnick & Dupérré, 2012 — Nicaragua
 Costarina bocas Platnick & Berniker, 2014 — Panama
 Costarina bochil Platnick & Dupérré, 2012 — Mexico
 Costarina branstetteri Platnick & Dupérré, 2012 — Honduras
 Costarina cahui Platnick & Dupérré, 2012 — Guatemala
 Costarina carara Platnick & Berniker, 2014 — Costa Rica
 Costarina carrillo Platnick & Berniker, 2014 — Costa Rica
 Costarina ceiba Platnick & Dupérré, 2012 — Honduras
 Costarina cerere Platnick & Berniker, 2014 — Costa Rica
 Costarina cerrocol Platnick & Berniker, 2014 — Panama
 Costarina chiles Platnick & Berniker, 2014 — Costa Rica
 Costarina chiriqui Platnick & Berniker, 2014 — Panama
 Costarina choco Platnick & Berniker, 2014 — Colombia
 Costarina chonta Platnick & Berniker, 2014 — Costa Rica
 Costarina cima Platnick & Berniker, 2014 — Costa Rica
 Costarina clara Platnick & Berniker, 2014 — Panama
 Costarina cofradia Platnick & Dupérré, 2012 — Honduras
 Costarina coma Platnick & Dupérré, 2012 — Honduras
 Costarina concinna (Chickering, 1968) — Costa Rica, Panama
 Costarina cortes Platnick & Dupérré, 2012 — Honduras
 Costarina cruces Platnick & Berniker, 2014 — Costa Rica
 Costarina cruz Platnick & Berniker, 2014 — Costa Rica
 Costarina cuerici Platnick & Berniker, 2014 — Costa Rica
 Costarina cusuco Platnick & Dupérré, 2012 — Honduras
 Costarina diablo Platnick & Berniker, 2014 — Nicaragua
 Costarina dura (Chickering, 1951) — Panama
 Costarina dybasi Platnick & Berniker, 2014 — Panama
 Costarina elena Platnick & Berniker, 2014 — Costa Rica
 Costarina espavel Platnick & Berniker, 2014 — Costa Rica
 Costarina fortuna Platnick & Berniker, 2014 — Panama
 Costarina frantzius Platnick & Berniker, 2014 — Costa Rica
 Costarina gemelo Platnick & Berniker, 2014 — Costa Rica
 Costarina gorgona Platnick & Berniker, 2014 — Colombia
 Costarina gracias Platnick & Dupérré, 2012 — Honduras
 Costarina helechal Platnick & Berniker, 2014 — Colombia
 Costarina hitoy Platnick & Berniker, 2014 — Costa Rica
 Costarina intempina (Chickering, 1968) — Panama
 Costarina isidro Platnick & Berniker, 2014 — Costa Rica
 Costarina iviei Platnick & Dupérré, 2012 — Mexico
 Costarina izabal Platnick & Dupérré, 2012 — Guatemala
 Costarina jimenez Platnick & Berniker, 2014 — Costa Rica
 Costarina junio Platnick & Berniker, 2014 — Costa Rica
 Costarina kilambe Platnick & Berniker, 2014 — Nicaragua
 Costarina leones Platnick & Berniker, 2014 — Costa Rica
 Costarina llama Platnick & Dupérré, 2012 — Mexico
 Costarina macha Platnick & Dupérré, 2012 — Guatemala
 Costarina macho Platnick & Berniker, 2014 — Costa Rica
 Costarina maritza Platnick & Berniker, 2014 — Costa Rica
 Costarina meridina (Chickering, 1968) — Costa Rica
 Costarina mixtepec Platnick & Dupérré, 2012 — Mexico
 Costarina monte Platnick & Berniker, 2014 — Costa Rica
 Costarina mooreorum Platnick & Berniker, 2014 — Costa Rica
 Costarina morales Platnick & Dupérré, 2012 — Guatemala
 Costarina muralla Platnick & Dupérré, 2012 — Honduras
 Costarina murphyorum Platnick & Berniker, 2014 — Costa Rica
 Costarina musun Platnick & Dupérré, 2012 — Nicaragua
 Costarina naja Platnick & Dupérré, 2012 — Mexico
 Costarina nara Platnick & Berniker, 2014 — Costa Rica
 Costarina oaxaca Platnick & Dupérré, 2012 — Mexico
 Costarina obtina (Chickering, 1968) — Costa Rica, Panama
 Costarina olancho Platnick & Dupérré, 2012 — Honduras
 Costarina osa Platnick & Berniker, 2014 — Costa Rica
 Costarina otun Platnick & Berniker, 2014 — Colombia
 Costarina palmar Platnick & Berniker, 2014 — Costa Rica
 Costarina parabio Platnick & Berniker, 2014 — Costa Rica
 Costarina parapalmar Platnick & Berniker, 2014 — Costa Rica
 Costarina paraplena Platnick & Berniker, 2014 — Costa Rica
 Costarina penshurst Platnick & Berniker, 2014 — Costa Rica
 Costarina peten Platnick & Dupérré, 2012 — Guatemala
 Costarina pittier Platnick & Berniker, 2014 — Costa Rica, Panama
 Costarina pity Platnick & Berniker, 2014 — Costa Rica
 Costarina plena (O. Pickard-Cambridge, 1894) (type) — Mexico to Costa Rica
 Costarina poas Platnick & Berniker, 2014 — Costa Rica
 Costarina quepos Platnick & Berniker, 2014 — Costa Rica
 Costarina rafael Platnick & Berniker, 2014 — Costa Rica
 Costarina ramon Platnick & Berniker, 2014 — Costa Rica
 Costarina recondita (Chickering, 1951) — Panama
 Costarina reventazon Platnick & Berniker, 2014 — Costa Rica
 Costarina saladito Platnick & Berniker, 2014 — Colombia
 Costarina san Platnick & Berniker, 2014 — Costa Rica
 Costarina sasaima Platnick & Berniker, 2014 — Colombia
 Costarina seclusa (Chickering, 1951) — Panama
 Costarina selva Platnick & Berniker, 2014 — Costa Rica
 Costarina semibio Platnick & Berniker, 2014 — Costa Rica
 Costarina sepultura Platnick & Dupérré, 2012 — Mexico
 Costarina sorkini Platnick & Berniker, 2014 — Panama
 Costarina subplena Platnick & Dupérré, 2012 — Mexico, Guatemala
 Costarina suiza Platnick & Berniker, 2014 — Colombia
 Costarina superplena Platnick & Berniker, 2014 — Costa Rica
 Costarina taraira Platnick & Berniker, 2014 — Colombia
 Costarina tela Platnick & Dupérré, 2012 — Honduras
 Costarina tskui Platnick & Berniker, 2014 — Panama
 Costarina ubicki Platnick & Berniker, 2014 — Costa Rica
 Costarina upala Platnick & Berniker, 2014 — Costa Rica
 Costarina veragua Platnick & Berniker, 2014 — Costa Rica
 Costarina viejo Platnick & Berniker, 2014 — Costa Rica
 Costarina waspuk Platnick & Dupérré, 2012 — Nicaragua
 Costarina watina (Chickering, 1968) — Costa Rica
 Costarina yotoco Platnick & Berniker, 2014 — Colombia

Cousinea

Cousinea Saaristo, 2001
 Cousinea keeleyi Saaristo, 2001 (type) — Seychelles

Coxapopha

Coxapopha Platnick, 2000
 Coxapopha bare Ott & Brescovit, 2004 — Brazil
 Coxapopha caeca (Birabén, 1954) — Argentina
 Coxapopha carinata Ott & Brescovit, 2004 — Brazil
 Coxapopha diblemma Platnick, 2000 (type) — Panama
 Coxapopha yuyapichis Ott & Brescovit, 2004 — Peru

D

Dalmasula

Dalmasula Platnick, Szüts & Ubick, 2012
 Dalmasula dodebai Szűts & Ubick, 2012 — South Africa
 Dalmasula griswoldi Szűts & Ubick, 2012 — South Africa
 Dalmasula lorelei Platnick & Dupérré, 2012 (type) — Namibia
 Dalmasula parvimana (Simon, 1910) — Namibia
 Dalmasula tsumkwe Platnick & Dupérré, 2012 — Namibia

Diblemma

Diblemma O. Pickard-Cambridge, 1908
 Diblemma donisthorpei O. Pickard-Cambridge, 1909 (type) — Seychelles

Dysderina

Dysderina Simon, 1892
 Dysderina amaca Platnick, Berniker & Bonaldo, 2013 — Colombia
 Dysderina ayo Platnick, Berniker & Bonaldo, 2013 — Colombia
 Dysderina baehrae Platnick, Berniker & Bonaldo, 2013 — Ecuador
 Dysderina bimucronata Simon, 1893 — Philippines
 Dysderina capensis Simon, 1907 — South Africa
 Dysderina craigi Platnick, Berniker & Bonaldo, 2013 — Colombia
 Dysderina cunday Platnick, Berniker & Bonaldo, 2013 — Colombia
 Dysderina erwini Platnick, Berniker & Bonaldo, 2013 — Ecuador
 Dysderina excavata Platnick, Berniker & Bonaldo, 2013 — Ecuador
 Dysderina granulosa Simon & Fage, 1922 — East Africa
 Dysderina insularum Roewer, 1963 — Caroline Is.
 Dysderina machinator (Keyserling, 1881) — Peru
 Dysderina matamata Platnick, Berniker & Bonaldo, 2013 — Colombia
 Dysderina perarmata Fage & Simon, 1936 — Kenya
 Dysderina principalis (Keyserling, 1881) (type) — Colombia
 Dysderina purpurea Simon, 1893 — Philippines
 Dysderina sacha Platnick, Berniker & Bonaldo, 2013 — Ecuador
 Dysderina sasaima Platnick, Berniker & Bonaldo, 2013 — Colombia
 Dysderina scutata (O. Pickard-Cambridge, 1876) — Egypt
 Dysderina speculifera Simon, 1907 — South Africa, Mozambique
 Dysderina straba Fage, 1936 — Kenya
 Dysderina sublaevis Simon, 1907 — Algeria
 Dysderina tiputini Platnick, Berniker & Bonaldo, 2013 — Ecuador
 Dysderina urucu Platnick, Berniker & Bonaldo, 2013 — Brazil

Dysderoides

Dysderoides Fage, 1946
 Dysderoides kaew Grismado & Deeleman, 2014 — Thailand
 Dysderoides kanoi Grismado & Deeleman, 2014 — Thailand
 Dysderoides lawa Grismado & Deeleman, 2014 — Thailand
 Dysderoides muang Grismado & Deeleman, 2014 — Thailand
 Dysderoides synrang Grismado & Deeleman, 2014 — India
 Dysderoides typhlos Fage, 1946 (type) — India

E

Emboonops

Emboonops Bolzern, Platnick & Berniker, 2015
 Emboonops arriaga Bolzern, Platnick & Berniker, 2015 — Mexico
 Emboonops bonampak Bolzern, Platnick & Berniker, 2015 — Mexico
 Emboonops calco Bolzern, Platnick & Berniker, 2015 — Mexico
 Emboonops catrin Bolzern, Platnick & Berniker, 2015 — Mexico
 Emboonops hermosa Bolzern, Platnick & Berniker, 2015 — Mexico
 Emboonops mckenziei (Gertsch, 1977) — Mexico
 Emboonops nejapa Bolzern, Platnick & Berniker, 2015 (type) — Mexico
 Emboonops palenque Bolzern, Platnick & Berniker, 2015 — Mexico
 Emboonops tamaz Bolzern, Platnick & Berniker, 2015 — Mexico
 Emboonops tuxtlas Bolzern, Platnick & Berniker, 2015 — Mexico

Escaphiella

Escaphiella Platnick & Dupérré, 2009
 Escaphiella acapulco Platnick & Dupérré, 2009 — Mexico
 Escaphiella aratau Platnick & Dupérré, 2009 — Brazil
 Escaphiella argentina (Birabén, 1954) — Argentina
 Escaphiella bahia Platnick & Dupérré, 2009 — Brazil
 Escaphiella betin Platnick & Dupérré, 2009 — Colombia
 Escaphiella blumenau Platnick & Dupérré, 2009 — Brazil
 Escaphiella bolivar Platnick & Dupérré, 2009 — Venezuela
 Escaphiella cachimbo Platnick & Dupérré, 2009 — Brazil
 Escaphiella catemaco Platnick & Dupérré, 2009 — Mexico
 Escaphiella chiapa Platnick & Dupérré, 2009 — Mexico
 Escaphiella cidades Platnick & Dupérré, 2009 — Brazil
 Escaphiella colima Platnick & Dupérré, 2009 — Mexico
 Escaphiella cristobal Platnick & Dupérré, 2009 — Ecuador (Galapagos Is.)
 Escaphiella exlineae Platnick & Dupérré, 2009 — Peru
 Escaphiella gertschi (Chickering, 1951) — Panama, Colombia, Venezuela, Jamaica, Galapagos Is.
 Escaphiella gigantea Platnick & Dupérré, 2009 — Colombia
 Escaphiella hespera (Chamberlin, 1924) (type) — USA, Mexico
 Escaphiella hesperoides Platnick & Dupérré, 2009 — Brazil
 Escaphiella iguala (Gertsch & Davis, 1942) — Mexico
 Escaphiella isabela Platnick & Dupérré, 2009 — Ecuador (Galapagos Is.)
 Escaphiella itys (Simon, 1893) — Cayman Is., Jamaica, Curaçao, Venezuela
 Escaphiella litoris (Chamberlin, 1924) — USA, Mexico
 Escaphiella maculosa Platnick & Dupérré, 2009 — Brazil
 Escaphiella magna Platnick & Dupérré, 2009 — Mexico
 Escaphiella morro Platnick & Dupérré, 2009 — Brazil
 Escaphiella nayarit Platnick & Dupérré, 2009 — Mexico
 Escaphiella nye Platnick & Dupérré, 2009 — USA
 Escaphiella ocoa Platnick & Dupérré, 2009 — Chile
 Escaphiella olivacea Platnick & Dupérré, 2009 — Mexico
 Escaphiella peckorum Platnick & Dupérré, 2009 — Argentina
 Escaphiella pocone Platnick & Dupérré, 2009 — Brazil, Argentina
 Escaphiella ramirezi Platnick & Dupérré, 2009 — Argentina, Uruguay
 Escaphiella schmidti (Reimoser, 1939) — Nicaragua, Costa Rica
 Escaphiella tayrona Platnick & Dupérré, 2009 — Colombia
 Escaphiella tonila Platnick & Dupérré, 2009 — Mexico
 Escaphiella viquezi Platnick & Dupérré, 2009 — Honduras, Nicaragua

F

Farqua

Farqua Saaristo, 2001
 Farqua quadrimaculata Saaristo, 2001 (type) — Seychelles (Farquhar Is.)

G

Gamasomorpha

Gamasomorpha Karsch, 1881
 Gamasomorpha anhuiensis Song & Xu, 1984 — China
 Gamasomorpha arabica Simon, 1893 — Middle East
 Gamasomorpha asterobothros Eichenberger, 2012 — Indonesia (Sumatra)
 Gamasomorpha austera Simon, 1898 — Seychelles
 Gamasomorpha australis Hewitt, 1915 — South Africa
 Gamasomorpha barbifera Tong & Li, 2007 — China
 Gamasomorpha bipeltis (Thorell, 1895) — Myanmar
 Gamasomorpha brasiliana Bristowe, 1938 — Brazil
 Gamasomorpha camelina Simon, 1893 — Singapore
 Gamasomorpha cataphracta Karsch, 1881 (type) — Korea, Taiwan, Japan, Philippines
 Gamasomorpha clarki Hickman, 1950 — Australia
 Gamasomorpha clypeolaria Simon, 1907 — India
 Gamasomorpha comosa Tong & Li, 2009 — China, Laos
 Gamasomorpha coniacris Eichenberger, 2012 — Malaysia, Indonesia (Bintan Is.)
 Gamasomorpha deksam Saaristo & van Harten, 2002 — Yemen (Socotra)
 Gamasomorpha fricki Eichenberger, 2012 — Vietnam
 Gamasomorpha gershomi Saaristo, 2007 — Israel
 Gamasomorpha humicola Lawrence, 1947 — South Africa
 Gamasomorpha humilis Mello-Leitão, 1920 — Brazil
 Gamasomorpha inclusa (Thorell, 1887) — Myanmar
 Gamasomorpha insomnia Eichenberger, 2012 — Thailand, Malaysia, Indonesia (Borneo, Sulawesi), New Guinea
 Gamasomorpha insularis Simon, 1907 — Madeira, Equatorial Guinea (Bioko), São Tomé and Príncipe, St. Helena, Mauritius, Yemen, Seychelles
 Gamasomorpha jeanneli Fage, 1936 — Kenya
 Gamasomorpha kabulensis Roewer, 1960 — Afghanistan
 Gamasomorpha keri Eichenberger, 2012 — Indonesia (Sumatra)
 Gamasomorpha kraepelini Simon, 1905 — Indonesia (Java)
 Gamasomorpha kusumii Komatsu, 1963 — Japan
 Gamasomorpha lalana Suman, 1965 — Hawaii, Japan
 Gamasomorpha linzhiensis Hu, 2001 — China
 Gamasomorpha longisetosa Lawrence, 1952 — South Africa
 Gamasomorpha lutzi (Petrunkevitch, 1929) — USA to Panama, Caribbean
 Gamasomorpha m-scripta Birabén, 1954 — Argentina
 Gamasomorpha microps Simon, 1907 — Sri Lanka
 Gamasomorpha mornensis Benoit, 1979 — Seychelles
 Gamasomorpha nigrilineata Xu, 1986 — China
 Gamasomorpha nitida Simon, 1893 — Philippines
 Gamasomorpha ophiria Eichenberger, 2012 — Malaysia
 Gamasomorpha parmata (Thorell, 1890) — Indonesia (Sumatra, Java, Lombok)
 Gamasomorpha patquiana Birabén, 1954 — Argentina
 Gamasomorpha petoteca Eichenberger, 2012 — Indonesia (Sumatra)
 Gamasomorpha plana (Keyserling, 1883) — Peru
 Gamasomorpha platensis Birabén, 1954 — Argentina
 Gamasomorpha porcina Simon, 1909 — Vietnam
 Gamasomorpha psyllodes Thorell, 1897 — Myanmar
 Gamasomorpha puberula (Simon, 1893) — Venezuela
 Gamasomorpha pusilla Berland, 1914 — East Africa
 Gamasomorpha raya Eichenberger, 2012 — Malaysia, Indonesia (Bintan Is.)
 Gamasomorpha rufa Banks, 1898 — Mexico
 Gamasomorpha schmilingi Eichenberger, 2012 — Malaysia, Indonesia (Bali)
 Gamasomorpha sculptilis Thorell, 1897 — Myanmar
 Gamasomorpha semitecta Simon, 1907 — Indonesia (Sumatra)
 Gamasomorpha servula Simon, 1908 — Australia (Western Australia)
 Gamasomorpha seximpressa Simon, 1907 — Indonesia (Java)
 Gamasomorpha silvestris (Simon, 1893) — Venezuela
 Gamasomorpha simplex (Simon, 1892) — St. Vincent
 Gamasomorpha squalens Eichenberger, 2012 — Malaysia
 Gamasomorpha subclathrata Simon, 1907 — Sri Lanka
 Gamasomorpha taprobanica Simon, 1893 — Sri Lanka
 Gamasomorpha testudinella Berland, 1914 — East Africa
 Gamasomorpha tovarensis (Simon, 1893) — Venezuela
 Gamasomorpha vianai Birabén, 1954 — Argentina
 Gamasomorpha virgulata Tong & Li, 2009 — China
 Gamasomorpha wasmanniae Mello-Leitão, 1939 — Argentina

Gradunguloonops

Gradunguloonops Grismado, Izquierdo, González M. & Ramírez, 2015
 Gradunguloonops amazonicus Grismado, Izquierdo, González M. & Ramírez, 2015 — Brazil
 Gradunguloonops benavidesae Grismado, Izquierdo, González M. & Ramírez, 2015 — Colombia
 Gradunguloonops bonaldoi Grismado, Izquierdo, González M. & Ramírez, 2015 — Brazil
 Gradunguloonops erwini Grismado, Izquierdo, González M. & Ramírez, 2015 — Peru
 Gradunguloonops florezi Grismado, Izquierdo, González M. & Ramírez, 2015 — Colombia
 Gradunguloonops juruti Grismado, Izquierdo, González M. & Ramírez, 2015 — Brazil
 Gradunguloonops mutum Grismado, Izquierdo, González M. & Ramírez, 2015 (type) — Peru, Brazil
 Gradunguloonops nadineae Grismado, Izquierdo, González M. & Ramírez, 2015 — Ecuador
 Gradunguloonops orellana Grismado, Izquierdo, González M. & Ramírez, 2015 — Ecuador
 Gradunguloonops pacanari Grismado, Izquierdo, González M. & Ramírez, 2015 — Brazil
 Gradunguloonops raptor Grismado, Izquierdo, González M. & Ramírez, 2015 — Venezuela
 Gradunguloonops urucu Grismado, Izquierdo, González M. & Ramírez, 2015 — Brazil

Grymeus

Grymeus Harvey, 1987
 Grymeus barbatus Harvey, 1987 — Australia (South Australia)
 Grymeus dharmapriyai Ranasinghe & Benjamin, 2018 — Sri Lanka
 Grymeus robertsi Harvey, 1987 (type) — Australia (Victoria)
 Grymeus yanga Harvey, 1987 — Australia (Victoria, New South Wales)

Guaraguaoonops

Guaraguaoonops Brescovit, Rheims & Bonaldo, 2012
 Guaraguaoonops hemhem Brescovit, Rheims & Bonaldo, 2012 (type) — Brazil
 Guaraguaoonops humbom Brescovit, Rheims & Bonaldo, 2012 — Brazil

Guatemoonops

Guatemoonops Bolzern, Platnick & Berniker, 2015
 Guatemoonops augustin Bolzern, Platnick & Berniker, 2015 — Guatemala
 Guatemoonops chilasco Bolzern, Platnick & Berniker, 2015 — Guatemala
 Guatemoonops jaba Bolzern, Platnick & Berniker, 2015 — Guatemala
 Guatemoonops purulha Bolzern, Platnick & Berniker, 2015 (type) — Guatemala
 Guatemoonops rhino Bolzern, Platnick & Berniker, 2015 — Mexico
 Guatemoonops zacapa Bolzern, Platnick & Berniker, 2015 — Guatemala

H

Heteroonops

Heteroonops Dalmas, 1916
 Heteroonops andros Platnick & Dupérré, 2009 — Bahama Is.
 Heteroonops castelloides Platnick & Dupérré, 2009 — Hispaniola
 Heteroonops castellus (Chickering, 1971) — Puerto Rico, Virgin Is.
 Heteroonops colombi Dumitrescu & Georgescu, 1983 — Cuba
 Heteroonops croix Platnick & Dupérré, 2009 — Virgin Is.
 Heteroonops iviei Platnick & Dupérré, 2009 — Hispaniola
 Heteroonops macaque Platnick & Dupérré, 2009 — Dominican Rep.
 Heteroonops murphyorum Platnick & Dupérré, 2009 — Costa Rica
 Heteroonops saba Platnick & Dupérré, 2009 — Saba, Montserrat
 Heteroonops singulus (Gertsch & Davis, 1942) — Mexico
 Heteroonops spinigata Platnick & Dupérré, 2009 — Jamaica
 Heteroonops spinimanus (Simon, 1892) (type) — North to South America, Caribbean. Introduced to Macaronesia, Germany, Seychelles, Madagascar, Australia, Pacific Is.
 Heteroonops toro Platnick & Dupérré, 2009 — Puerto Rico
 Heteroonops validus (Bryant, 1948) — Hispaniola
 Heteroonops vega Platnick & Dupérré, 2009 — Hispaniola

Hexapopha

Hexapopha Platnick, Berniker & Víquez, 2014
 Hexapopha hone Platnick, Berniker & Víquez, 2014 — Costa Rica
 Hexapopha jimenez Platnick, Berniker & Víquez, 2014 — Costa Rica
 Hexapopha osa Platnick, Berniker & Víquez, 2014 — Costa Rica
 Hexapopha reimoseri (Fage, 1938) (type) — Costa Rica

Himalayana

Himalayana Grismado, 2014
 Himalayana andreae Grismado, 2014 — India
 Himalayana castanopsis Grismado, 2014 — Nepal
 Himalayana kathmandu Grismado, 2014 (type) — Nepal
 Himalayana martensi Grismado, 2014 — Nepal
 Himalayana parbat Grismado, 2014 — Nepal
 Himalayana siliwalae Grismado, 2014 — India

Hortoonops

Hortoonops Platnick & Dupérré, 2012
 Hortoonops excavatus Platnick & Dupérré, 2012 — Hispaniola
 Hortoonops lucradus (Chickering, 1969) (type) — Virgin Is.
 Hortoonops portoricensis (Petrunkevitch, 1929) — Puerto Rico

Hypnoonops

Hypnoonops Benoit, 1977
 Hypnoonops lejeunei Benoit, 1977 (type) — Congo

Hytanis

Hytanis Simon, 1893
 Hytanis oblonga Simon, 1893 (type) — Venezuela

I

Ischnothyreus

Ischnothyreus Simon, 1893
 Ischnothyreus aculeatus (Simon, 1893) — Philippines
 Ischnothyreus an Tong & Li, 2016 — Singapore
 Ischnothyreus arcus Edward & Harvey, 2014 — Australia (Queensland)
 Ischnothyreus ascifer Richard, 2016 — Indonesia (Sumatra)
 Ischnothyreus auritus Tong & Li, 2012 — China
 Ischnothyreus baltenspergerae Richard, 2016 — Indonesia (Java)
 Ischnothyreus balu Kranz-Baltensperger, 2011 — Borneo
 Ischnothyreus barratus Edward & Harvey, 2014 — Australia (Queensland)
 Ischnothyreus barus Kranz-Baltensperger, 2011 — Borneo
 Ischnothyreus bauri Richard, 2016 — Indonesia (Java)
 Ischnothyreus bifidus Edward & Harvey, 2014 — Australia (Queensland)
 Ischnothyreus binorbis Edward & Harvey, 2014 — Australia (Queensland)
 Ischnothyreus bipartitus Simon, 1893 — Sri Lanka
 Ischnothyreus boonjee Edward & Harvey, 2014 — Australia (Queensland)
 Ischnothyreus browni Chickering, 1968 — Philippines
 Ischnothyreus brunneus Tong & Li, 2016 — Singapore
 Ischnothyreus bualveus Edward & Harvey, 2014 — Australia (Queensland)
 Ischnothyreus bupariorbis Edward & Harvey, 2014 — Australia (Queensland)
 Ischnothyreus campanaceus Tong & Li, 2008 — China
 Ischnothyreus chippy Ranasinghe & Benjamin, 2018 — Sri Lanka
 Ischnothyreus collingwoodi Edward & Harvey, 2014 — Australia (Queensland)
 Ischnothyreus comicus Edward & Harvey, 2014 — Australia (Queensland)
 Ischnothyreus concavus Richard, 2016 — Indonesia (Sumatra)
 Ischnothyreus corniculatum Edward & Harvey, 2014 — Australia (Queensland)
 Ischnothyreus cornuatus Edward & Harvey, 2014 — Australia (Queensland)
 Ischnothyreus corollacous Tong & Li, 2013 — Laos
 Ischnothyreus crenulatus Edward & Harvey, 2014 — Australia (Queensland)
 Ischnothyreus culleni Edward & Harvey, 2014 — Australia (Queensland)
 Ischnothyreus dactylinus Tong & Li, 2016 — Singapore
 Ischnothyreus danum Kranz-Baltensperger, 2011 — Borneo
 Ischnothyreus darwini Edward & Harvey, 2009 — Australia (Northern Territory)
 Ischnothyreus deccanensis Tikader & Malhotra, 1974 — India
 Ischnothyreus deelemanae Kranz-Baltensperger, 2011 — Borneo
 Ischnothyreus digitus Edward & Harvey, 2014 — Australia (Queensland)
 Ischnothyreus eacham Edward & Harvey, 2014 — Australia (Queensland)
 Ischnothyreus elvis Kranz-Baltensperger, 2011 — Borneo
 Ischnothyreus eungella Edward & Harvey, 2014 — Australia (Queensland)
 Ischnothyreus falcatus Tong & Li, 2008 — China
 Ischnothyreus falcifer Kranz-Baltensperger, 2011 — Borneo
 Ischnothyreus flabellifer Kranz-Baltensperger, 2011 — Borneo
 Ischnothyreus flagellichelis Xu, 1989 — China
 Ischnothyreus flippi Kranz-Baltensperger, 2011 — Borneo
 Ischnothyreus florence Edward & Harvey, 2014 — Australia (Northern Territory)
 Ischnothyreus florifer Kranz-Baltensperger, 2011 — Borneo
 Ischnothyreus fobor Kranz-Baltensperger, 2011 — Borneo
 Ischnothyreus gigeri Richard, 2016 — Indonesia (Java)
 Ischnothyreus habeggeri Richard, 2016 — Indonesia (Sumatra)
 Ischnothyreus hamatus Edward & Harvey, 2014 — Australia (Queensland)
 Ischnothyreus hanae Tong & Li, 2008 — China
 Ischnothyreus haymozi Richard, 2016 — Indonesia (Sumatra)
 Ischnothyreus hooki Kranz-Baltensperger, 2011 — Borneo
 Ischnothyreus hoplophorus Edward & Harvey, 2014 — Australia (Queensland)
 Ischnothyreus jivani Benoit, 1979 — Seychelles
 Ischnothyreus jojo Kranz-Baltensperger, 2011 — Borneo
 Ischnothyreus julianneae Edward & Harvey, 2014 — Australia (Queensland)
 Ischnothyreus kalimantan Kranz-Baltensperger, 2011 — Borneo
 Ischnothyreus kentingensis Tong & Li, 2014 — Taiwan
 Ischnothyreus ker Edward & Harvey, 2014 — Australia (Queensland)
 Ischnothyreus khamis Saaristo & van Harten, 2006 — Yemen
 Ischnothyreus lanutoo Marples, 1955 — Samoa
 Ischnothyreus ligulatus Richard, 2016 — Indonesia (Java)
 Ischnothyreus linzhiensis Hu, 2001 — China
 Ischnothyreus lucidus Richard, 2016 — Indonesia (Sumatra)
 Ischnothyreus lymphaseus Simon, 1893 — Sri Lanka
 Ischnothyreus marggii Richard, 2016 — Indonesia (Sumatra)
 Ischnothyreus matang Kranz-Baltensperger, 2011 — Borneo
 Ischnothyreus meidamon Edward & Harvey, 2014 — Australia (Queensland)
 Ischnothyreus microphthalmus Richard, 2016 — Indonesia (Sumatra)
 Ischnothyreus monteithi Edward & Harvey, 2014 — Australia (Queensland)
 Ischnothyreus mulumi Kranz-Baltensperger, 2011 — Borneo
 Ischnothyreus namo Kranz-Baltensperger, 2012 — Malaysia
 Ischnothyreus narutomii (Nakatsudi, 1942) — China, Taiwan, Japan
 Ischnothyreus nentwigorum Richard, 2016 — Indonesia (Java)
 Ischnothyreus nourlangie Edward & Harvey, 2014 — Australia (Northern Territory)
 Ischnothyreus obscurus Richard, 2016 — Indonesia (Sumatra)
 Ischnothyreus ovinus Edward & Harvey, 2014 — Australia (Queensland)
 Ischnothyreus pacificus Roewer, 1963 — Micronesia
 Ischnothyreus peltifer (Simon, 1892) (type) — Tropical Asia. Introduced to North, Central, South America, Britain, Gaboon, Seychelles, Madagascar, Hawaii
 Ischnothyreus piricius Edward & Harvey, 2014 — Australia (Queensland)
 Ischnothyreus poculum Tong & Li, 2016 — Singapore
 Ischnothyreus pterodactyl Edward & Harvey, 2014 — Australia (Queensland, New South Wales)
 Ischnothyreus puruntatamerii Edward & Harvey, 2014 — Australia (Northern Territory)
 Ischnothyreus qianlongae Tong & Li, 2008 — China
 Ischnothyreus raveni Edward & Harvey, 2014 — Australia (Queensland)
 Ischnothyreus rex Kranz-Baltensperger, 2011 — Borneo
 Ischnothyreus rixi Edward & Harvey, 2014 — Australia (Queensland)
 Ischnothyreus serapi Kranz-Baltensperger, 2011 — Borneo
 Ischnothyreus serpentinum Saaristo, 2001 — Seychelles, Madagascar, Indonesia (Java)
 Ischnothyreus shillongensis Tikader, 1968 — India, Bhutan
 Ischnothyreus sigridae Richard, 2016 — Indonesia (Java)
 Ischnothyreus spineus Tong & Li, 2012 — China
 Ischnothyreus stauntoni Edward & Harvey, 2014 — Australia (Queensland)
 Ischnothyreus subaculeatus Roewer, 1938 — Indonesia (Moluccas)
 Ischnothyreus tadetu Tong & Li, 2013 — Laos
 Ischnothyreus tadfane Tong & Li, 2013 — Laos
 Ischnothyreus tectorius Tong & Li, 2016 — Singapore
 Ischnothyreus tekek Kranz-Baltensperger, 2012 — Malaysia
 Ischnothyreus tioman Kranz-Baltensperger, 2012 — Malaysia
 Ischnothyreus tragicus Edward & Harvey, 2014 — Australia (Queensland)
 Ischnothyreus tumidus Edward & Harvey, 2014 — Australia (Queensland)
 Ischnothyreus ujungkulon Richard, 2016 — Indonesia (Java)
 Ischnothyreus velox Jackson, 1908 — Tropical Asia. Introduced to North and Central America, Britain, Netherlands, Germany, Seychelles, Madagascar, Hawaii
 Ischnothyreus xui Tong & Li, 2012 — China
 Ischnothyreus yuanyeae Tong & Li, 2012 — China
 Ischnothyreus yueluensis Yin & Wang, 1984 — China
 Ischnothyreus zhoujiayan Tong & Li, 2018 — China

K

Kachinia

Kachinia Tong & Li, 2018
 Kachinia mahmolae Tong & Li, 2018 — Myanmar
 Kachinia putao Tong & Li, 2018 (type) — Myanmar

Kapitia

Kapitia Forster, 1956
 Kapitia obscura Forster, 1956 (type) — New Zealand

Khamiscar

Khamiscar Platnick & Berniker, 2015
 Khamiscar ambi Platnick & Berniker, 2015 — Madagascar
 Khamiscar anta Platnick & Berniker, 2015 (type) — Madagascar
 Khamiscar baly Platnick & Berniker, 2015 — Madagascar
 Khamiscar kiri Platnick & Berniker, 2015 — Madagascar
 Khamiscar maro Platnick & Berniker, 2015 — Madagascar
 Khamiscar tola Platnick & Berniker, 2015 — Madagascar

Khamisia

Khamisia Saaristo & van Harten, 2006
 Khamisia atlit Platnick & Berniker, 2015 — Israel
 Khamisia banisad Saaristo & van Harten, 2006 (type) — Yemen
 Khamisia hayer Platnick & Berniker, 2015 — United Arab Emirates. Introduced to Cape Verde Is.
 Khamisia holmi Platnick & Berniker, 2015 — Kenya

Khamisina

Khamisina Platnick & Berniker, 2015
 Khamisina ibadan Platnick & Berniker, 2015 — Nigeria
 Khamisina kilifi Platnick & Berniker, 2015 — Kenya
 Khamisina kivu Platnick & Berniker, 2015 (type) — Congo

Khamisoides

Khamisoides Platnick & Berniker, 2015
 Khamisoides calabash Platnick & Berniker, 2015 — Virgin Is.
 Khamisoides edwardsi Platnick & Berniker, 2015 (type) — Virgin Is.
 Khamisoides muchmorei Platnick & Berniker, 2015 — Virgin Is.

Kijabe

Kijabe Berland, 1914
 Kijabe ensifera Caporiacco, 1949 — Kenya
 Kijabe paradoxa Berland, 1914 (type) — East Africa

L

Lionneta

Lionneta Benoit, 1979
 Lionneta gerlachi Saaristo, 2001 — Seychelles
 Lionneta mahensis Benoit, 1979 — Seychelles
 Lionneta orophila (Benoit, 1979) — Seychelles
 Lionneta praslinensis Benoit, 1979 — Seychelles
 Lionneta savyi (Benoit, 1979) — Seychelles
 Lionneta sechellensis Benoit, 1979 (type) — Seychelles
 Lionneta silhouettei Benoit, 1979 — Seychelles
 Lionneta veli Saaristo, 2002 — Seychelles

Longoonops

Longoonops Platnick & Dupérré, 2010
 Longoonops bicolor Platnick & Dupérré, 2010 (type) — Nicaragua, Costa Rica
 Longoonops chickeringi Platnick & Dupérré, 2010 — Panama
 Longoonops ellae Platnick, Dupérré & Berniker, 2013 — Cuba
 Longoonops gorda Platnick & Dupérré, 2010 — Virgin Is.
 Longoonops noctucus (Chickering, 1969) — Virgin Is.
 Longoonops padiscus (Chickering, 1969) — Jamaica

Lucetia

Lucetia Dumitrescu & Georgescu, 1983
 Lucetia distincta Dumitrescu & Georgescu, 1983 (type) — Cuba, Venezuela

M

Malagiella

Malagiella Ubick & Griswold, 2011
 Malagiella ambalavo Ubick & Griswold, 2011 — Madagascar
 Malagiella andringitra Ubick & Griswold, 2011 — Madagascar
 Malagiella fisheri Ubick & Griswold, 2011 — Madagascar
 Malagiella goodmani Ubick & Griswold, 2011 — Madagascar
 Malagiella nikina Ubick & Griswold, 2011 — Madagascar
 Malagiella ranavalona Ubick & Griswold, 2011 — Madagascar
 Malagiella ranomafana Ubick & Griswold, 2011 (type) — Madagascar
 Malagiella toliara Ubick & Griswold, 2011 — Madagascar
 Malagiella valterova Ubick & Griswold, 2011 — Madagascar
 Malagiella vohiparara Ubick & Griswold, 2011 — Madagascar

Megabulbus

Megabulbus Saaristo, 2007
 Megabulbus sansan Saaristo, 2007 (type) — Israel

Megaoonops

Megaoonops Saaristo, 2007
 Megaoonops avrona Saaristo, 2007 (type) — Israel

Melchisedec

Melchisedec Fannes, 2010
 Melchisedec birni Fannes, 2010 — Niger
 Melchisedec thevenot Fannes, 2010 (type) — West, East Africa

Molotra

Molotra Ubick & Griswold, 2011
 Molotra katarinae Ubick & Griswold, 2011 — Madagascar
 Molotra milloti Ubick & Griswold, 2011 — Madagascar
 Molotra molotra Ubick & Griswold, 2011 (type) — Madagascar
 Molotra ninae Ubick & Griswold, 2011 — Madagascar
 Molotra suzannae Ubick & Griswold, 2011 — Madagascar
 Molotra tsingy Ubick & Griswold, 2011 — Madagascar

N

Neotrops

Neotrops Grismado & Ramírez, 2013
 Neotrops amacuro Grismado & Ramírez, 2013 — Venezuela
 Neotrops avalosi Grismado & Ramírez, 2013 — Paraguay, Argentina
 Neotrops caparu Grismado & Ramírez, 2013 — Colombia
 Neotrops darwini Grismado & Ramírez, 2013 (type) — Argentina, Uruguay
 Neotrops donaldi (Chickering, 1951) — Panama
 Neotrops izquierdoi Grismado & Ramírez, 2013 — Bolivia
 Neotrops kopuchianae Grismado & Ramírez, 2013 — Bolivia
 Neotrops labarquei Grismado & Ramírez, 2013 — Uruguay
 Neotrops lopardoae Grismado & Ramírez, 2013 — Argentina
 Neotrops lorenae Grismado & Ramírez, 2013 — Argentina, Uruguay
 Neotrops maracay Grismado & Ramírez, 2013 — Venezuela
 Neotrops nigromaculatus (Mello-Leitão, 1944) — Argentina, Uruguay
 Neotrops pakitza Grismado & Ramírez, 2013 — Peru
 Neotrops piacentinii Grismado & Ramírez, 2013 — Argentina
 Neotrops pithecia Grismado & Ramírez, 2013 — Peru
 Neotrops platnicki Grismado & Ramírez, 2013 — Ecuador
 Neotrops poguazu Grismado & Ramírez, 2013 — Argentina
 Neotrops pombero Grismado & Ramírez, 2013 — Paraguay, Argentina
 Neotrops ramirezi Izquierdo & Grismado, 2014 — Colombia
 Neotrops rubioi Grismado & Ramírez, 2013 — Paraguay, Argentina
 Neotrops santamarta Grismado & Ramírez, 2013 — Colombia
 Neotrops sciosciae Grismado & Ramírez, 2013 — Argentina, Uruguay
 Neotrops silvae Grismado & Ramírez, 2013 — Peru
 Neotrops trapellus (Chickering, 1970) — Trinidad, Venezuela
 Neotrops tucumanus (Simon, 1907) — Argentina
 Neotrops waorani Grismado & Ramírez, 2013 — Ecuador
 Neotrops yabare Grismado & Ramírez, 2013 — Bolivia
 Neotrops yunga Grismado & Ramírez, 2013 — Argentina

Neoxyphinus

Neoxyphinus Birabén, 1953
 Neoxyphinus almerim Feitosa & Bonaldo, 2017 — Brazil
 Neoxyphinus amazonicus Moss & Feitosa, 2016 — Colombia, Brazil
 Neoxyphinus axe Abrahim & Brescovit, 2012 — Brazil
 Neoxyphinus barreirosi Abrahim & Bonaldo, 2012 — Colombia, Venezuela, Guyana, Brazil
 Neoxyphinus belterra Feitosa & Ruiz, 2017 — Brazil
 Neoxyphinus beni Moss & Feitosa, 2016 — Bolivia
 Neoxyphinus boibumba Abrahim & Rheims, 2012 — Brazil
 Neoxyphinus cachimbo Feitosa & Moss, 2017 — Brazil
 Neoxyphinus cantareira Feitosa & Ruiz, 2017 — Brazil
 Neoxyphinus capiranga Feitosa & Moss, 2017 — Brazil
 Neoxyphinus caprichoso Feitosa & Ruiz, 2017 — Brazil
 Neoxyphinus carigoblin Feitosa & Moss, 2017 — Brazil
 Neoxyphinus cavus Feitosa & Bonaldo, 2017 — Brazil
 Neoxyphinus caxiuana Feitosa & Moss, 2017 — Brazil
 Neoxyphinus celluliticus Feitosa & Ruiz, 2017 — Brazil
 Neoxyphinus coari Feitosa & Moss, 2017 — Brazil
 Neoxyphinus coca Moss & Feitosa, 2016 — Ecuador
 Neoxyphinus crasto Feitosa & Moss, 2017 — Brazil
 Neoxyphinus ducke Feitosa & Ruiz, 2017 — Brazil
 Neoxyphinus furtivus (Chickering, 1968) — Jamaica, Trinidad, Brazil
 Neoxyphinus garantido Feitosa & Ruiz, 2017 — Brazil
 Neoxyphinus gregoblin Abrahim & Santos, 2012 — Venezuela
 Neoxyphinus hispidus (Dumitrescu & Georgescu, 1987) — Venezuela
 Neoxyphinus inca Moss & Ruiz, 2016 — Peru
 Neoxyphinus jacareacanga Feitosa & Ruiz, 2017 — Brazil
 Neoxyphinus keyserlingi (Simon, 1907) — Brazil
 Neoxyphinus macuna Moss & Ruiz, 2016 — Colombia
 Neoxyphinus meurei Feitosa & Bonaldo, 2017 — Brazil
 Neoxyphinus murici Feitosa & Bonaldo, 2017 — Brazil
 Neoxyphinus mutum Feitosa & Moss, 2017 — Brazil
 Neoxyphinus novalima Feitosa & Ruiz, 2017 — Brazil
 Neoxyphinus ornithogoblin Feitosa & Bonaldo, 2017 — Brazil
 Neoxyphinus paraiba Feitosa & Moss, 2017 — Brazil
 Neoxyphinus paraty Feitosa & Ruiz, 2017 — Brazil
 Neoxyphinus petrogoblin Abrahim & Ott, 2012 — Colombia, Ecuador, Peru, Brazil
 Neoxyphinus pure Moss & Bonaldo, 2016 — Colombia
 Neoxyphinus rio Feitosa & Bonaldo, 2017 — Brazil
 Neoxyphinus saarineni Moss & Bonaldo, 2016 — Venezuela
 Neoxyphinus sax Feitosa & Bonaldo, 2017 — Brazil
 Neoxyphinus simsinho Feitosa & Bonaldo, 2017 — Brazil
 Neoxyphinus stigmatus Feitosa & Bonaldo, 2017 — Brazil
 Neoxyphinus termitophilus (Bristowe, 1938) — Brazil, Argentina
 Neoxyphinus trujillo Moss & Bonaldo, 2016 — Venezuela
 Neoxyphinus tucuma Feitosa & Moss, 2017 — Brazil
 Neoxyphinus tuparro Moss & Ruiz, 2016 — Colombia
 Neoxyphinus xyphinoides (Chamberlin & Ivie, 1942) — Guyana
 Neoxyphinus yacambu Moss & Feitosa, 2016 — Venezuela
 Neoxyphinus yekuana Moss & Feitosa, 2016 — Venezuela

Nephrochirus

Nephrochirus Simon, 1910
 Nephrochirus copulatus Simon, 1910 (type) — Namibia

Niarchos

Niarchos Platnick & Dupérré, 2010
 Niarchos baehrae Platnick & Dupérré, 2010 — Ecuador
 Niarchos barragani Platnick & Dupérré, 2010 — Ecuador
 Niarchos bonaldoi Platnick & Dupérré, 2010 — Ecuador
 Niarchos cotopaxi Platnick & Dupérré, 2010 (type) — Ecuador
 Niarchos elicioi Platnick & Dupérré, 2010 — Ecuador
 Niarchos facundoi Platnick & Dupérré, 2010 — Ecuador
 Niarchos florezi Platnick & Dupérré, 2010 — Colombia
 Niarchos foreroi Platnick & Dupérré, 2010 — Ecuador
 Niarchos grismadoi Platnick & Dupérré, 2010 — Ecuador
 Niarchos keili Platnick & Dupérré, 2010 — Ecuador
 Niarchos ligiae Platnick & Dupérré, 2010 — Ecuador
 Niarchos loja Platnick & Dupérré, 2010 — Ecuador, Peru
 Niarchos matiasi Platnick & Dupérré, 2010 — Ecuador
 Niarchos michaliki Platnick & Dupérré, 2010 — Ecuador
 Niarchos normani Dupérré & Tapia, 2017 — Ecuador
 Niarchos palenque Platnick & Dupérré, 2010 — Ecuador
 Niarchos ramirezi Platnick & Dupérré, 2010 — Ecuador
 Niarchos rheimsae Platnick & Dupérré, 2010 — Ecuador
 Niarchos santosi Platnick & Dupérré, 2010 — Ecuador
 Niarchos scutatus Platnick & Dupérré, 2010 — Ecuador
 Niarchos tapiai Platnick & Dupérré, 2010 — Ecuador
 Niarchos vegai Platnick & Dupérré, 2010 — Ecuador
 Niarchos wygodzinskyi Platnick & Dupérré, 2010 — Colombia

Noideattella

Noideattella Álvarez-Padilla, Ubick & Griswold, 2012
 Noideattella amboa Álvarez-Padilla, Ubick & Griswold, 2012 — Madagascar
 Noideattella assumptia (Saaristo, 2001) — Madagascar, Seychelles (Assumption Is., Farquhar Is.)
 Noideattella famafa Álvarez-Padilla, Ubick & Griswold, 2012 — Madagascar
 Noideattella fantara Álvarez-Padilla, Ubick & Griswold, 2012 — Madagascar
 Noideattella farihy Álvarez-Padilla, Ubick & Griswold, 2012 — Madagascar
 Noideattella gamela Álvarez-Padilla, Ubick & Griswold, 2012 — Madagascar
 Noideattella lakana Álvarez-Padilla, Ubick & Griswold, 2012 — Madagascar
 Noideattella mamba Álvarez-Padilla, Ubick & Griswold, 2012 — Madagascar
 Noideattella omby Álvarez-Padilla, Ubick & Griswold, 2015 — Madagascar
 Noideattella saka Álvarez-Padilla, Ubick & Griswold, 2012 — Madagascar
 Noideattella sylvnata Álvarez-Padilla, Ubick & Griswold, 2015 — Madagascar
 Noideattella tany Álvarez-Padilla, Ubick & Griswold, 2012 — Madagascar
 Noideattella tsiba Álvarez-Padilla, Ubick & Griswold, 2012 — Madagascar

Noonops

Noonops Platnick & Berniker, 2013
 Noonops beattyi Platnick & Berniker, 2013 — Mexico
 Noonops californicus Platnick & Berniker, 2013 — USA
 Noonops chapul Platnick & Berniker, 2013 — Mexico
 Noonops chilapensis (Chamberlin & Ivie, 1936) — Mexico
 Noonops coachella Platnick & Berniker, 2013 — USA
 Noonops culiacan Platnick & Berniker, 2013 — Mexico
 Noonops floridanus (Chamberlin & Ivie, 1935) (type) — USA, Bahama Is.
 Noonops furtivus (Gertsch, 1936) — USA, Mexico
 Noonops iviei Platnick & Berniker, 2013 — Mexico
 Noonops joshua Platnick & Berniker, 2013 — USA
 Noonops mesa Platnick & Berniker, 2013 — Mexico
 Noonops minutus Platnick & Berniker, 2013 — Mexico
 Noonops miraflores Platnick & Berniker, 2013 — Mexico
 Noonops mortero Platnick & Berniker, 2013 — USA
 Noonops naci Platnick & Berniker, 2013 — Mexico
 Noonops ocotillo Platnick & Berniker, 2013 — USA
 Noonops puebla (Gertsch & Davis, 1942) — Mexico
 Noonops skinner Platnick & Berniker, 2013 — USA
 Noonops sonora (Gertsch & Davis, 1942) — USA, Mexico
 Noonops tarantula Platnick & Berniker, 2013 — Mexico
 Noonops taxquillo Platnick & Berniker, 2013 — Mexico
 Noonops tonila Platnick & Berniker, 2013 — Mexico
 Noonops willisi Platnick & Berniker, 2013 — Mexico

O

Oonopinus

Oonopinus Simon, 1893
 Oonopinus angustatus (Simon, 1882) (type) — Spain, France (mainland, Corsica), Algeria
 Oonopinus aurantiacus Simon, 1893 — Venezuela
 Oonopinus bistriatus Simon, 1907 — Sierra Leone
 Oonopinus corneus Tong & Li, 2008 — China
 Oonopinus ionicus Brignoli, 1979 — Greece
 Oonopinus kilikus Suman, 1965 — Seychelles, Hawaii
 Oonopinus oceanicus Marples, 1955 — Samoa, Niue
 Oonopinus pilulus Suman, 1965 — China, USA (Hawaii)
 Oonopinus pruvotae Berland, 1929 — New Caledonia

Oonopoides

Oonopoides Bryant, 1940
 Oonopoides anoxus (Chickering, 1970) — Panama
 Oonopoides bolivari Dumitrescu & Georgescu, 1987 — Venezuela
 Oonopoides cartago Platnick & Berniker, 2013 — Costa Rica, Panama
 Oonopoides catemaco Platnick & Berniker, 2013 — Mexico
 Oonopoides cavernicola Dumitrescu & Georgescu, 1983 — Cuba
 Oonopoides chicanna Platnick & Berniker, 2013 — Mexico
 Oonopoides cristo Platnick & Berniker, 2013 — Costa Rica
 Oonopoides endicus (Chickering, 1971) — USA, Bahama Is.
 Oonopoides habanensis Dumitrescu & Georgescu, 1983 — Cuba
 Oonopoides hondo Platnick & Berniker, 2013 — Honduras
 Oonopoides humboldti Dumitrescu & Georgescu, 1983 — Cuba
 Oonopoides iviei Platnick & Berniker, 2013 — USA, Bahama Is.
 Oonopoides kaplanae Platnick & Berniker, 2013 — Mexico
 Oonopoides maxillaris Bryant, 1940 (type) — Cuba
 Oonopoides mitchelli (Gertsch, 1977) — Mexico
 Oonopoides orghidani Dumitrescu & Georgescu, 1983 — Cuba
 Oonopoides pallidulus (Chickering, 1951) — Panama, possibly Jamaica
 Oonopoides pilosus Dumitrescu & Georgescu, 1983 — Cuba
 Oonopoides secretus (Gertsch, 1936) — USA, Mexico
 Oonopoides singularis Dumitrescu & Georgescu, 1983 — Cuba
 Oonopoides upala Platnick & Berniker, 2013 — Costa Rica
 Oonopoides zullinii Brignoli, 1974 — Mexico

Oonops

Oonops Templeton, 1835
 Oonops acanthopus Simon, 1907 — Brazil
 Oonops alticola Berland, 1914 — East Africa
 Oonops amacus Chickering, 1970 — Trinidad
 Oonops amoenus Dalmas, 1916 — France
 Oonops aristelus Chickering, 1972 — Antigua and Barbuda (Antigua)
 Oonops balanus Chickering, 1971 — Caribbean
 Oonops caecus Benoit, 1975 — Lesotho
 Oonops citrinus Berland, 1914 — East Africa
 Oonops cubanus Dumitrescu & Georgescu, 1983 — Cuba
 Oonops cuervus Gertsch & Davis, 1942 — Mexico
 Oonops domesticus Dalmas, 1916 — Europe, Georgia
 Oonops ebenecus Chickering, 1972 — Puerto Rico
 Oonops erinaceus Benoit, 1977 — St. Helena
 Oonops figuratus Simon, 1892 — St. Vincent, Venezuela
 Oonops gavarrensis Bosselaers, 2017 — Spain
 Oonops globimanus Simon, 1892 — St. Vincent, Venezuela
 Oonops hasselti Strand, 1906 — Scandinavia
 Oonops itascus Chickering, 1970 — Trinidad
 Oonops leai Rainbow, 1920 — Australia (Lord Howe Is.)
 Oonops leitaoni Bristowe, 1938 — Brazil
 Oonops longespinosus Denis, 1937 — Algeria
 Oonops longipes Berland, 1914 — East Africa
 Oonops loxoscelinus Simon, 1893 — Venezuela
 Oonops lubricus Dalmas, 1916 — France
 Oonops mahnerti Brignoli, 1974 — Greece
 Oonops minutus Dumitrescu & Georgescu, 1983 — Cuba
 Oonops oblucus Chickering, 1972 — Jamaica
 Oonops olitor Simon, 1911 — Algeria
 Oonops ornatus Chickering, 1970 — Panama
 Oonops persitus Chickering, 1970 — Panama
 Oonops petulans Gertsch & Davis, 1942 — Mexico
 Oonops placidus Dalmas, 1916 — France
 Oonops placidus corsicus Dalmas, 1916 — France, Italy
 Oonops procerus Simon, 1882 — France, Spain
 Oonops propinquus Dumitrescu & Georgescu, 1983 — Cuba
 Oonops pulcher Templeton, 1835 (type) — Europe, North Africa. Introduced to Tasmania
 Oonops pulcher hispanicus Dalmas, 1916 — Spain
 Oonops pulicarius Simon, 1892 — St. Vincent, Venezuela
 Oonops reddelli Gertsch, 1977 — Mexico
 Oonops reticulatus Petrunkevitch, 1925 — Costa Rica, Panama, Puerto Rico, Trinidad
 Oonops ronoxus Chickering, 1971 — Virgin Is.
 Oonops rowlandi Gertsch, 1977 — Mexico
 Oonops sativus Chickering, 1970 — Trinidad
 Oonops sicorius Chickering, 1970 — Curaçao
 Oonops stylifer Gertsch, 1936 — USA
 Oonops tectulus Chickering, 1970 — Trinidad
 Oonops triangulipes Karsch, 1881 — Micronesia
 Oonops tubulatus Dalmas, 1916 — Portugal, Algeria
 Oonops vestus Chickering, 1970 — Trinidad
 Oonops viridans Bryant, 1942 — Puerto Rico

Opopaea

Opopaea Simon, 1892
 Opopaea aculeata Baehr & Harvey, 2013 — Australia (Western Australia)
 Opopaea acuminata Baehr, 2013 — Australia (New South Wales)
 Opopaea addsae Baehr & Smith, 2013 — Australia (New South Wales)
 Opopaea alje Saaristo & Marusik, 2008 — Tanzania
 Opopaea ameyi Baehr, 2013 — Australia (Queensland)
 Opopaea amieu Baehr, 2013 — New Caledonia
 Opopaea andranomay Andriamalala & Hormiga, 2013 — Madagascar
 Opopaea andringitra Andriamalala & Hormiga, 2013 — Madagascar
 Opopaea ankarafantsika Andriamalala & Hormiga, 2013 — Madagascar
 Opopaea ankarana Andriamalala & Hormiga, 2013 — Madagascar
 Opopaea antoniae Baehr, 2011 — Australia (Queensland, New South Wales)
 Opopaea antsalova Andriamalala & Hormiga, 2013 — Madagascar
 Opopaea antsiranana Andriamalala & Hormiga, 2013 — Madagascar
 Opopaea apicalis (Simon, 1893) (type) — Indonesia, Philippines, Thailand. Introduced to USA, Mexico, Panama, Ecuador, Seychelles, Pacific Is.
 Opopaea aurantiaca Baehr & Harvey, 2013 — Australia (Western Australia)
 Opopaea auriforma Tong & Li, 2015 — China
 Opopaea banksi (Hickman, 1950) — Australia (South Australia)
 Opopaea batanguena Barrion & Litsinger, 1995 — Philippines
 Opopaea bemaraha Andriamalala & Hormiga, 2013 — Madagascar
 Opopaea bemarivo Andriamalala & Hormiga, 2013 — Madagascar
 Opopaea berenty Andriamalala & Hormiga, 2013 — Madagascar
 Opopaea berlandi (Simon & Fage, 1922) — East Africa
 Opopaea betioky Andriamalala & Hormiga, 2013 — Madagascar
 Opopaea bicolor Baehr, 2013 — New Caledonia
 Opopaea billroth Baehr & Harvey, 2013 — Australia (Western Australia)
 Opopaea botswana Saaristo & Marusik, 2008 — Botswana
 Opopaea brisbanensis Baehr, 2013 — Australia (Queensland)
 Opopaea broadwater Baehr, 2013 — Australia (Queensland)
 Opopaea burwelli Baehr, 2013 — New Caledonia
 Opopaea bushblitz Baehr, 2013 — Australia (New South Wales)
 Opopaea calcaris Baehr, 2013 — New Caledonia
 Opopaea callani Baehr & Harvey, 2013 — Australia (Western Australia)
 Opopaea calona Chickering, 1969 — USA
 Opopaea carnarvon Baehr, 2013 — Australia (Queensland)
 Opopaea carteri Baehr, 2013 — Australia (Queensland)
 Opopaea chrisconwayi Baehr & Smith, 2013 — Australia (Queensland)
 Opopaea chunglinchaoi Barrion, Barrion-Dupo & Heong, 2013 — China
 Opopaea concolor (Blackwall, 1859) — Tropical Africa. Introduced to Hawaii, North, Central and South America
 Opopaea conujaingensis (Xu, 1986) — China
 Opopaea cornuta Yin & Wang, 1984 — China, Taiwan, Laos, Iran?
 Opopaea cowra Baehr & Harvey, 2013 — Australia (Western Australia)
 Opopaea deserticola Simon, 1892 — USA (Florida), Mexico to Panama, Brazil, Caribbean Is. Introduced to Canary Is., Germany, Japan (Ogasawara Is.), Pacific Is.
 Opopaea diaolaushan Tong & Li, 2010 — China
 Opopaea douglasi Baehr, 2013 — Australia (Queensland)
 Opopaea durranti Baehr & Harvey, 2013 — Australia (Western Australia)
 Opopaea ectognophus Harvey & Edward, 2007 — Australia (Western Australia)
 Opopaea ephemera Baehr, 2013 — Australia (Northern Territory)
 Opopaea euphorbicola Strand, 1909 — Ascension Is.
 Opopaea exoculata Baehr & Harvey, 2013 — Australia (Western Australia)
 Opopaea fiji Baehr, 2013 — Fiji
 Opopaea fishriver Baehr, 2013 — Australia (Northern Territory)
 Opopaea flabellata Tong & Li, 2015 — China
 Opopaea flava Baehr & Harvey, 2013 — Australia (Western Australia)
 Opopaea floridana (Banks, 1896) — USA
 Opopaea foulpointe Andriamalala & Hormiga, 2013 — Madagascar
 Opopaea foveolata Roewer, 1963 — Pacific Is.
 Opopaea fragilis Baehr & Harvey, 2013 — Australia (Western Australia)
 Opopaea framenaui Baehr & Harvey, 2013 — Australia (Western Australia)
 Opopaea furcula Tong & Li, 2010 — China
 Opopaea gabon Saaristo & Marusik, 2008 — Gabon
 Opopaea gaborone Saaristo & Marusik, 2008 — Botswana
 Opopaea gerstmeieri Baehr, 2013 — Australia (New South Wales)
 Opopaea gibbifera Tong & Li, 2008 — China
 Opopaea gilliesi Baehr, 2013 — Australia (Northern Territory)
 Opopaea goloboffi Baehr, 2013 — New Caledonia
 Opopaea gracilis Baehr & Harvey, 2013 — Australia (Western Australia)
 Opopaea gracillima Baehr & Harvey, 2013 — Australia (Western Australia)
 Opopaea harmsi Baehr & Harvey, 2013 — Australia (Western Australia)
 Opopaea hawaii Baehr, 2013 — Hawaii
 Opopaea hoplites (Berland, 1914) — East Africa
 Opopaea ita Ott, 2003 — Brazil
 Opopaea itampolo Andriamalala & Hormiga, 2013 — Madagascar
 Opopaea johannae Baehr & Harvey, 2013 — Australia (Western Australia)
 Opopaea johardingae Baehr, 2013 — Australia (Northern Territory)
 Opopaea jonesae Baehr, 2011 — Australia (Queensland)
 Opopaea julianneae Baehr & Ott, 2013 — Australia (Western Australia)
 Opopaea kirindy Andriamalala & Hormiga, 2013 — Madagascar
 Opopaea kulczynskii (Berland, 1914) — East Africa
 Opopaea lambkinae Baehr, 2013 — Australia (Queensland)
 Opopaea lebretoni Baehr, 2013 — Australia (New South Wales)
 Opopaea leica Baehr, 2011 — Australia (Queensland)
 Opopaea leichhardti Baehr, 2013 — Australia (Queensland)
 Opopaea lemniscata Tong & Li, 2013 — Laos
 Opopaea linea Baehr, 2013 — Australia (Queensland, New South Wales)
 Opopaea lingua Saaristo, 2007 — Israel
 Opopaea macula Tong & Li, 2015 — China
 Opopaea magna Baehr, 2013 — Australia (New South Wales)
 Opopaea mahafaly Andriamalala & Hormiga, 2013 — Madagascar
 Opopaea manderano Andriamalala & Hormiga, 2013 — Madagascar
 Opopaea manongarivo Andriamalala & Hormiga, 2013 — Madagascar
 Opopaea marangaroo Baehr & Harvey, 2013 — Australia (Western Australia)
 Opopaea margaretehoffmannae Baehr & Smith, 2013 — Australia (New South Wales)
 Opopaea margaritae (Denis, 1947) — Egypt
 Opopaea maroantsetra Andriamalala & Hormiga, 2013 — Comoros, Madagascar
 Opopaea martini Baehr, 2013 — Australia (New South Wales)
 Opopaea mattica Simon, 1893 — Gabon, South Africa
 Opopaea mcleani Baehr, 2013 — Australia (Queensland)
 Opopaea media Song & Xu, 1984 — China
 Opopaea meditata Gertsch & Davis, 1936 — USA
 Opopaea michaeli Baehr & Smith, 2013 — Australia (New South Wales)
 Opopaea millbrook Baehr, 2013 — Australia (South Australia)
 Opopaea milledgei Baehr, 2013 — Australia (New South Wales)
 Opopaea millstream Baehr & Harvey, 2013 — Australia (Western Australia)
 Opopaea mollis (Simon, 1907) — Sri Lanka
 Opopaea monteithi Baehr, 2013 — New Caledonia
 Opopaea mundy Baehr, 2013 — Australia (South Australia)
 Opopaea nadineae Baehr & Harvey, 2013 — Australia (Western Australia)
 Opopaea namoroka Andriamalala & Hormiga, 2013 — Madagascar
 Opopaea ndoua Baehr, 2013 — New Caledonia
 Opopaea nibasa Saaristo & van Harten, 2006 — Yemen
 Opopaea nitens Baehr, 2013 — Australia (New South Wales)
 Opopaea olivernashi Baehr, 2011 — Australia (Queensland)
 Opopaea ottoi Baehr, 2013 — Australia (New South Wales)
 Opopaea palau Baehr, 2013 — Palau Is.
 Opopaea pallida Baehr & Harvey, 2013 — Australia (Western Australia)
 Opopaea pannawonica Baehr & Ott, 2013 — Australia (Western Australia)
 Opopaea phineus Harvey & Edward, 2007 — Australia (Western Australia)
 Opopaea pilbara Baehr & Ott, 2013 — Australia (Western Australia)
 Opopaea plana Baehr, 2013 — Australia (New South Wales)
 Opopaea platnicki Baehr, 2013 — New Caledonia
 Opopaea plumula Yin & Wang, 1984 — China
 Opopaea preecei Baehr, 2013 — Australia (Northern Territory)
 Opopaea probosciella Saaristo, 2001 — Seychelles
 Opopaea proserpine Baehr, 2013 — Australia (Queensland)
 Opopaea punctata (O. Pickard-Cambridge, 1872) — Turkey, Lebanon, Israel
 Opopaea raveni Baehr, 2013 — New Caledonia
 Opopaea rigidula Tong & Li, 2015 — China
 Opopaea rixi Baehr & Harvey, 2013 — Australia (Western Australia)
 Opopaea robusta Baehr & Harvey, 2013 — Australia (Western Australia)
 Opopaea rogerkitchingi Baehr, 2011 — Australia (Queensland)
 Opopaea rugosa Baehr & Ott, 2013 — Australia (Western Australia)
 Opopaea saaristoi Wunderlich, 2011 — Cyprus
 Opopaea sallami Saaristo & van Harten, 2006 — Yemen
 Opopaea sanaa Saaristo & van Harten, 2006 — Yemen
 Opopaea sandranantitra Andriamalala & Hormiga, 2013 — Madagascar
 Opopaea santschii Brignoli, 1974 — Tunisia, Cyprus, Greece (Crete), Egypt, Israel
 Opopaea sanya Tong & Li, 2010 — China
 Opopaea sauteri Brignoli, 1974 — China, Taiwan
 Opopaea sedata Gertsch & Mulaik, 1940 — USA
 Opopaea semilunata Tong & Li, 2015 — China
 Opopaea shanasi Saaristo, 2007 — Israel
 Opopaea silhouettei (Benoit, 1979) — Seychelles. Introduced to Austral Is. (Rapa)
 Opopaea simoni (Berland, 1914) — East Africa
 Opopaea simplex Baehr, 2013 — Australia (New South Wales)
 Opopaea sown Baehr, 2011 — Australia (Queensland, New South Wales)
 Opopaea speciosa (Lawrence, 1952) — South Africa, Yemen
 Opopaea speighti Baehr, 2011 — Australia (Queensland)
 Opopaea spinosa Saaristo & van Harten, 2006 — Yemen
 Opopaea spinosiscorona Ranasinghe & Benjamin, 2018 — Sri Lanka
 Opopaea sponsa Brignoli, 1978 — Bhutan
 Opopaea stanisici Baehr, 2013 — Australia (Queensland)
 Opopaea stevensi Baehr, 2013 — Australia (South Australia)
 Opopaea striata Baehr, 2013 — New Caledonia
 Opopaea sturt Baehr, 2013 — Australia (New South Wales)
 Opopaea subtilis Baehr & Harvey, 2013 — Australia (Western Australia)
 Opopaea sudan Saaristo & Marusik, 2008 — Sudan
 Opopaea suelewisae Baehr & Smith, 2013 — Australia (New South Wales)
 Opopaea suspecta Saaristo, 2002 — Seychelles
 Opopaea syarakui (Komatsu, 1967) — Korea, Japan
 Opopaea sylvestrella Baehr & Smith, 2013 — Australia (New South Wales)
 Opopaea tenuis Baehr, 2013 — Australia (New South Wales)
 Opopaea torotorofotsy Andriamalala & Hormiga, 2013 — Madagascar
 Opopaea touho Baehr, 2013 — New Caledonia
 Opopaea triangularis Baehr & Harvey, 2013 — Australia (Western Australia)
 Opopaea tsimaloto Andriamalala & Hormiga, 2013 — Madagascar
 Opopaea tsimbazaza Andriamalala & Hormiga, 2013 — Madagascar
 Opopaea tsimembo Andriamalala & Hormiga, 2013 — Madagascar
 Opopaea tsingy Andriamalala & Hormiga, 2013 — Madagascar
 Opopaea tsinjoriaky Andriamalala & Hormiga, 2013 — Madagascar
 Opopaea tuberculata Baehr, 2013 — New Caledonia
 Opopaea tumida Tong & Li, 2013 — Laos
 Opopaea ulrichi Baehr, 2013 — Australia (Queensland)
 Opopaea ursulae Baehr, 2013 — Australia (New South Wales)
 Opopaea viamao Ott, 2003 — Brazil, Argentina
 Opopaea vitrispina Tong & Li, 2010 — China
 Opopaea vohibazaha Andriamalala & Hormiga, 2013 — Madagascar
 Opopaea wheelarra Baehr & Ott, 2013 — Australia (Western Australia)
 Opopaea whim Baehr & Harvey, 2013 — Australia (Western Australia)
 Opopaea wongalara Baehr, 2013 — Australia (Northern Territory)
 Opopaea yorki Baehr, 2013 — Australia (New South Wales)
 Opopaea yukii Baehr, 2011 — Australia (Queensland)
 Opopaea zhengi Tong & Li, 2015 — China

Orchestina

Orchestina Simon, 1882
 Orchestina acaciae Henrard & Jocqué, 2012 — Tanzania
 Orchestina aerumnae Brignoli, 1978 — Bhutan
 Orchestina algerica Dalmas, 1916 — Algeria
 Orchestina ampulla Henrard & Jocqué, 2012 — Tanzania
 Orchestina andianavarroi Izquierdo, 2017 — Argentina
 Orchestina apiculata Liu, Xiao & Xu, 2016 — China
 Orchestina aproeste Izquierdo, 2017 — Brazil
 Orchestina arabica Dalmas, 1916 — Yemen
 Orchestina aragua Izquierdo, 2017 — Venezuela
 Orchestina arboleda Izquierdo, 2017 — Colombia
 Orchestina atocongo Izquierdo, 2017 — Peru
 Orchestina auburndalensis Izquierdo, 2017 — USA
 Orchestina aureola Tong & Li, 2011 — China
 Orchestina bedu Saaristo & van Harten, 2002 — Yemen (Socotra)
 Orchestina bialata Liu, Xiao & Xu, 2016 — China
 Orchestina bolivar Izquierdo, 2017 — Venezuela
 Orchestina bonaldoi Izquierdo, 2017 — Brazil
 Orchestina cachai Izquierdo, 2017 — Chile
 Orchestina cajamarca Izquierdo, 2017 — Peru
 Orchestina caleta Izquierdo, 2017 — Chile
 Orchestina cali Izquierdo, 2017 — Colombia
 Orchestina campana Izquierdo, 2017 — Panama
 Orchestina catarina Izquierdo, 2017 — Brazil
 Orchestina caxiuana Izquierdo, 2017 — Brazil
 Orchestina chaparrita Izquierdo, 2017 — Mexico
 Orchestina chiriqui Izquierdo, 2017 — Costa Rica, Panama
 Orchestina cincta Simon, 1893 — South Africa
 Orchestina clavigera Henrard & Jocqué, 2012 — Kenya
 Orchestina clavulata Tong & Li, 2011 — China
 Orchestina coari Izquierdo, 2017 — Brazil
 Orchestina codalmasi Wunderlich, 2011 — Malaysia
 Orchestina comaina Izquierdo, 2017 — Peru
 Orchestina communis Henrard & Jocqué, 2012 — Ghana to Kenya
 Orchestina cornuta Henrard & Jocqué, 2012 — Cameroon
 Orchestina cristinae Izquierdo, 2017 — Brazil, Paraguay, Argentina
 Orchestina crypta Henrard & Jocqué, 2012 — Congo
 Orchestina curico Izquierdo, 2017 — Chile
 Orchestina dalmasi Denis, 1956 — Morocco
 Orchestina debakkeri Henrard & Jocqué, 2012 — Ghana
 Orchestina dentifera Simon, 1893 — Caribbean, Brazil. Introduced to Tanzania, Réunion, Seychelles, Sri Lanka
 Orchestina divisor Izquierdo, 2017 — Brazil
 Orchestina dubia O. Pickard-Cambridge, 1911 — Britain
 Orchestina ebriola Brignoli, 1972 — Greece
 Orchestina ecuatorensis Izquierdo, 2017 — Ecuador
 Orchestina elegans Simon, 1893 — Philippines
 Orchestina erwini Izquierdo, 2017 — Ecuador
 Orchestina fannesi Henrard & Jocqué, 2012 — Namibia, South Africa
 Orchestina fernandina Izquierdo, 2017 — Ecuador (Galapagos)
 Orchestina filandia Izquierdo, 2017 — Colombia
 Orchestina flagella Saaristo & van Harten, 2006 — Yemen
 Orchestina flava Ono, 2005 — Japan
 Orchestina foa Saaristo & van Harten, 2002 — Yemen (Socotra)
 Orchestina fractipes Henrard & Jocqué, 2012 — West, Central Africa
 Orchestina furcillata Wunderlich, 2008 — Azores
 Orchestina galapagos Izquierdo, 2017 — Jamaica, Panama, Ecuador (Galapagos)
 Orchestina gibbotibialis Henrard & Jocqué, 2012 — Kenya
 Orchestina gigabulbus Henrard & Jocqué, 2012 — Ghana
 Orchestina goblin Izquierdo, 2017 — Colombia, Ecuador, Peru
 Orchestina golem Izquierdo, 2017 — Ecuador, Peru, Brazil
 Orchestina granizo Izquierdo, 2017 — Chile
 Orchestina grismadoi Izquierdo, 2017 — Bolivia
 Orchestina griswoldi Izquierdo, 2017 — Costa Rica
 Orchestina guatemala Izquierdo, 2017 — Guatemala
 Orchestina hammamali Saaristo & van Harten, 2006 — Yemen
 Orchestina iemanja Izquierdo, 2017 — Brazil
 Orchestina infirma Seo, 2017 — Korea
 Orchestina intricata Henrard & Jocqué, 2012 — Somalia, Tanzania
 Orchestina itapety Izquierdo, 2017 — Brazil
 Orchestina jaiba Izquierdo, 2017 — Chile, Argentina
 Orchestina juruti Izquierdo, 2017 — Brazil
 Orchestina justini Saaristo, 2001 — Seychelles
 Orchestina kairi Izquierdo, 2017 — Trinidad
 Orchestina kamehameha Izquierdo, 2017 — USA (Hawaii)
 Orchestina kasuku Henrard & Jocqué, 2012 — Congo
 Orchestina labarquei Izquierdo, 2017 — Panama
 Orchestina lahj Saaristo & van Harten, 2006 — Yemen
 Orchestina lanceolata Henrard & Jocqué, 2012 — Cameroon
 Orchestina laselva Izquierdo, 2017 — Costa Rica, Ecuador
 Orchestina launcestoniensis Hickman, 1932 — Australia (Tasmania)
 Orchestina leon Izquierdo, 2017 — Brazil
 Orchestina longipes Dalmas, 1922 — Italy
 Orchestina losamigos Izquierdo, 2017 — Peru
 Orchestina luispi Izquierdo, 2017 — Argentina
 Orchestina macrofoliata Henrard & Jocqué, 2012 — Congo
 Orchestina madrededios Izquierdo, 2017 — Peru
 Orchestina magna Izquierdo, 2017 — Ecuador
 Orchestina mancocapac Izquierdo, 2017 — Peru
 Orchestina manicata Simon, 1893 — Sri Lanka, Vietnam
 Orchestina maracay Izquierdo, 2017 — Venezuela
 Orchestina maureen Saaristo, 2001 — Seychelles
 Orchestina mayo Izquierdo, 2017 — Ecuador
 Orchestina microfoliata Henrard & Jocqué, 2012 — Congo, Uganda
 Orchestina minutissima Denis, 1937 — Algeria, Spain
 Orchestina mirabilis Saaristo & van Harten, 2006 — Yemen
 Orchestina moaba Chamberlin & Ivie, 1935 — USA
 Orchestina molles Izquierdo, 2017 — Chile
 Orchestina moura Izquierdo, 2017 — Brazil
 Orchestina moyuchi Izquierdo, 2017 — Bolivia
 Orchestina multipunctata Liu, Xiao & Xu, 2016 — China
 Orchestina nadleri Chickering, 1969 — USA
 Orchestina nahuatl Izquierdo, 2017 — Mexico
 Orchestina nahuelbuta Izquierdo, 2017 — Chile
 Orchestina neblina Izquierdo, 2017 — Venezuela
 Orchestina obscura Chamberlin & Ivie, 1942 — USA
 Orchestina okitsui Oi, 1958 — Japan
 Orchestina osorno Izquierdo, 2017 — Chile
 Orchestina otonga Izquierdo, 2017 — Ecuador
 Orchestina pakitza Izquierdo, 2017 — Colombia, Peru
 Orchestina pan Izquierdo, 2017 — Panama
 Orchestina pandeazucar Izquierdo, 2017 — Chile
 Orchestina para Izquierdo, 2017 — Brazil
 Orchestina paupercula Dalmas, 1916 — Gabon
 Orchestina pavesii (Simon, 1873) (type) — Canary Is., Southwest Europe to Greece, Bulgaria, Algeria, Egypt, Yemen
 Orchestina pavesiiformis Saaristo, 2007 — Portugal, Spain, Israel. Introduced to USA, Brazil, Argentina, Uruguay
 Orchestina pilifera Dalmas, 1916 — Sri Lanka
 Orchestina pizarroi Izquierdo, 2017 — Chile
 Orchestina platnicki Izquierdo, 2017 — Colombia, Brazil, Argentina
 Orchestina predator Izquierdo, 2017 — Ecuador
 Orchestina probosciformis Henrard & Jocqué, 2012 — Congo, Uganda
 Orchestina quasimodo Izquierdo, 2017 — USA
 Orchestina quenies Izquierdo, 2017 — Chile
 Orchestina quijos Izquierdo, 2017 — Ecuador
 Orchestina ranchogrande Izquierdo, 2017 — Venezuela
 Orchestina rapaz Izquierdo, 2017 — Brazil
 Orchestina retiro Izquierdo, 2017 — Brazil
 Orchestina saaristoi Henrard & Jocqué, 2012 — Nigeria, Congo, Yemen
 Orchestina saltabunda Simon, 1893 — Venezuela
 Orchestina saltitans Banks, 1894 — USA
 Orchestina sanguinea Oi, 1955 — Japan
 Orchestina santodomingo Izquierdo, 2017 — Ecuador
 Orchestina sarava Izquierdo, 2017 — Brazil
 Orchestina saudade Izquierdo, 2017 — Brazil
 Orchestina sechellorum Benoit, 1979 — Seychelles
 Orchestina sedotmikha Saaristo, 2007 — Israel
 Orchestina setosa Dalmas, 1916 — France, Italy, Crete
 Orchestina shuar Izquierdo, 2017 — Ecuador
 Orchestina silvae Izquierdo, 2017 — Peru
 Orchestina simoni Dalmas, 1916 — France, Italy, Greece, Turkey
 Orchestina sinensis Xu, 1987 — China, Taiwan
 Orchestina sotoi Izquierdo, 2017 — Ecuador, Brazil
 Orchestina storozhenkoi (Saaristo & Marusik, 2004) — Russia (Far East)
 Orchestina striata Simon, 1909 — Vietnam
 Orchestina taruma Izquierdo, 2017 — Brazil
 Orchestina thoracica Xu, 1987 — China
 Orchestina topcui Danişman & Coşar, 2012 — Turkey
 Orchestina totoralillo Izquierdo, 2017 — Chile
 Orchestina truncata Wunderlich, 2004 — Costa Rica, Colombia, Ecuador
 Orchestina truncatula Tong & Li, 2011 — China, India
 Orchestina tubifera Simon, 1893 — Sri Lanka
 Orchestina tubulata Tong & Li, 2011 — China
 Orchestina tzantza Izquierdo, 2017 — Ecuador, Peru
 Orchestina ucumar Izquierdo, 2017 — Bolivia, Brazil, Argentina
 Orchestina utahana Chamberlin & Ivie, 1935 — USA, Mexico
 Orchestina vainuia Marples, 1955 — Samoa
 Orchestina valquiria Izquierdo, 2017 — Brazil
 Orchestina venezuela Izquierdo, 2017 — Venezuela
 Orchestina waorani Izquierdo, 2017 — Ecuador, Brazil
 Orchestina yanayacu Izquierdo, 2017 — Ecuador
 Orchestina yinggezui Tong & Li, 2011 — China
 Orchestina zhengi Tong & Li, 2011 — China
 Orchestina zingara Izquierdo, 2017 — Colombia

Ovobulbus

Ovobulbus Saaristo, 2007
 Ovobulbus boker Saaristo, 2007 (type) — Israel
 Ovobulbus bokerella Saaristo, 2007 — Egypt, Israel
 Ovobulbus elot Saaristo, 2007 — Israel

P

Paradysderina

Paradysderina Platnick & Dupérré, 2011
 Paradysderina apurimac Platnick & Dupérré, 2011 — Peru
 Paradysderina asymmetrica Platnick & Dupérré, 2011 — Peru
 Paradysderina baehrae Platnick & Dupérré, 2011 — Ecuador
 Paradysderina bagua Platnick & Dupérré, 2011 — Peru
 Paradysderina boyaca Platnick & Dupérré, 2011 — Colombia
 Paradysderina carpish Platnick & Dupérré, 2011 — Peru
 Paradysderina carrizal Platnick & Dupérré, 2011 — Colombia
 Paradysderina centro Platnick & Dupérré, 2011 — Ecuador
 Paradysderina chinacota Platnick & Dupérré, 2011 — Colombia
 Paradysderina chingaza Platnick & Dupérré, 2011 — Colombia
 Paradysderina consuelo Platnick & Dupérré, 2011 — Peru
 Paradysderina convencion Platnick & Dupérré, 2011 — Peru
 Paradysderina dracula Platnick & Dupérré, 2011 — Ecuador
 Paradysderina excavata Platnick & Dupérré, 2011 — Peru
 Paradysderina fatima Platnick & Dupérré, 2011 — Peru
 Paradysderina fusiscuta Platnick & Dupérré, 2011 — Ecuador
 Paradysderina globosa (Keyserling, 1877) — Colombia, Peru
 Paradysderina hermani Platnick & Dupérré, 2011 — Ecuador
 Paradysderina huila Platnick & Dupérré, 2011 — Colombia
 Paradysderina imir Platnick & Dupérré, 2011 — Colombia
 Paradysderina lefty Platnick & Dupérré, 2011 — Ecuador
 Paradysderina leticia Platnick & Dupérré, 2011 — Colombia
 Paradysderina loreto Platnick & Dupérré, 2011 — Peru, Brazil
 Paradysderina lostayos Platnick & Dupérré, 2011 — Ecuador
 Paradysderina macho Platnick & Dupérré, 2011 — Peru
 Paradysderina maldonado Platnick & Dupérré, 2011 — Peru
 Paradysderina malkini Platnick & Dupérré, 2011 — Peru
 Paradysderina monstrosa Platnick & Dupérré, 2011 — Colombia
 Paradysderina montana (Keyserling, 1883) — Peru
 Paradysderina newtoni Platnick & Dupérré, 2011 — Peru
 Paradysderina pecki Platnick & Dupérré, 2011 — Ecuador
 Paradysderina pinzoni Platnick & Dupérré, 2011 — Colombia
 Paradysderina pira Platnick & Dupérré, 2011 — Colombia
 Paradysderina pithecia Platnick & Dupérré, 2011 — Peru
 Paradysderina piura Platnick & Dupérré, 2011 — Peru
 Paradysderina puyo Platnick & Dupérré, 2011 — Ecuador
 Paradysderina righty Platnick & Dupérré, 2011 — Ecuador
 Paradysderina rothae Platnick & Dupérré, 2011 — Peru
 Paradysderina sauce Platnick & Dupérré, 2011 — Peru
 Paradysderina schizo Platnick & Dupérré, 2011 — Peru
 Paradysderina silvae Platnick & Dupérré, 2011 — Peru
 Paradysderina sucumbios Platnick & Dupérré, 2011 — Ecuador
 Paradysderina tabaconas Platnick & Dupérré, 2011 — Peru
 Paradysderina tambo Platnick & Dupérré, 2011 — Peru
 Paradysderina tambopata Platnick & Dupérré, 2011 — Peru
 Paradysderina thayerae Platnick & Dupérré, 2011 — Peru
 Paradysderina vaupes Platnick & Dupérré, 2011 — Colombia
 Paradysderina vlad Platnick & Dupérré, 2011 — Ecuador
 Paradysderina watrousi Platnick & Dupérré, 2011 (type) — Peru
 Paradysderina wygodzinskyi Platnick & Dupérré, 2011 — Peru
 Paradysderina yanayacu Platnick & Dupérré, 2011 — Ecuador
 Paradysderina yasua Platnick & Dupérré, 2011 — Peru
 Paradysderina yasuni Platnick & Dupérré, 2011 — Ecuador
 Paradysderina zamora Platnick & Dupérré, 2011 — Ecuador

Patri

Patri Saaristo, 2001
 Patri david (Benoit, 1979) (type) — Seychelles

Pelicinus

Pelicinus Simon, 1892
 Pelicinus amrishi (Makhan & Ezzatpanah, 2011) — Iran
 Pelicinus churchillae Platnick, Dupérré, Ott, Baehr & Kranz-Baltensperger, 2012 — Solomon Is.
 Pelicinus damieu Platnick, Dupérré, Ott, Baehr & Kranz-Baltensperger, 2012 — New Caledonia
 Pelicinus deelemanae Platnick, Dupérré, Ott, Baehr & Kranz-Baltensperger, 2012 — Thailand
 Pelicinus duong Platnick, Dupérré, Ott, Baehr & Kranz-Baltensperger, 2012 — Vietnam
 Pelicinus johor Platnick, Dupérré, Ott, Baehr & Kranz-Baltensperger, 2012 — Malaysia
 Pelicinus khao Platnick, Dupérré, Ott, Baehr & Kranz-Baltensperger, 2012 — Thailand
 Pelicinus koghis Platnick, Dupérré, Ott, Baehr & Kranz-Baltensperger, 2012 — New Caledonia
 Pelicinus lachivala Platnick, Dupérré, Ott, Baehr & Kranz-Baltensperger, 2012 — India
 Pelicinus madurai Platnick, Dupérré, Ott, Baehr & Kranz-Baltensperger, 2012 — India
 Pelicinus marmoratus Simon, 1892 (type) — Tropical Asia. Introduced to Pacific Is., Caribbean, Brazil, Canary Is., Kenya, Seychelles
 Pelicinus monteithi Platnick, Dupérré, Ott, Baehr & Kranz-Baltensperger, 2012 — New Caledonia
 Pelicinus penang Platnick, Dupérré, Ott, Baehr & Kranz-Baltensperger, 2012 — Malaysia
 Pelicinus raveni Platnick, Dupérré, Ott, Baehr & Kranz-Baltensperger, 2012 — Fiji
 Pelicinus saaristoi Ott & Harvey, 2008 — Australia (Western Australia)
 Pelicinus sayam Platnick, Dupérré, Ott, Baehr & Kranz-Baltensperger, 2012 — Thailand
 Pelicinus schwendingeri Platnick, Dupérré, Ott, Baehr & Kranz-Baltensperger, 2012 — Thailand, China
 Pelicinus sengleti Platnick, Dupérré, Ott, Baehr & Kranz-Baltensperger, 2012 — Iran
 Pelicinus snooky Ranasinghe & Benjamin, 2018 — Sri Lanka
 Pelicinus tham Platnick, Dupérré, Ott, Baehr & Kranz-Baltensperger, 2012 — Laos
 Pelicinus tumpy Ranasinghe & Benjamin, 2018 — Sri Lanka

Pescennina

Pescennina Simon, 1903
 Pescennina arborea Platnick & Dupérré, 2011 — Panama, Colombia, Ecuador
 Pescennina cupida (Keyserling, 1881) — Colombia
 Pescennina epularis Simon, 1903 (type) — Venezuela
 Pescennina fusca Platnick & Dupérré, 2011 — Panama
 Pescennina gertschi Platnick & Dupérré, 2011 — Mexico
 Pescennina grismadoi Platnick & Dupérré, 2011 — Bolivia
 Pescennina ibarrai Platnick & Dupérré, 2011 — Mexico
 Pescennina iviei Platnick & Dupérré, 2011 — Mexico
 Pescennina laselva Platnick & Dupérré, 2011 — Costa Rica, Panama
 Pescennina loreto Platnick & Dupérré, 2011 — Peru
 Pescennina magdalena Platnick & Dupérré, 2011 — Colombia
 Pescennina murphyorum Platnick & Dupérré, 2011 — Nicaragua, Costa Rica
 Pescennina orellana Platnick & Dupérré, 2011 — Ecuador
 Pescennina otti Platnick & Dupérré, 2011 — Brazil
 Pescennina piura Platnick & Dupérré, 2011 — Peru
 Pescennina sasaima Platnick & Dupérré, 2011 — Colombia
 Pescennina sumidero Platnick & Dupérré, 2011 — Mexico
 Pescennina viquezi Platnick & Dupérré, 2011 — Costa Rica

Plectoptilus

Plectoptilus Simon, 1905
 Plectoptilus myops Simon, 1905 (type) — Indonesia (Java)

Ponsoonops

Ponsoonops Bolzern, 2014
 Ponsoonops bilzae Bolzern, 2014 — Costa Rica
 Ponsoonops bollo Bolzern, 2014 — Panama
 Ponsoonops boquete Bolzern, 2014 — Panama
 Ponsoonops coiba Bolzern, 2014 — Panama
 Ponsoonops duenas Bolzern, 2014 — Guatemala
 Ponsoonops fanselix Bolzern, 2014 — Panama
 Ponsoonops frio Bolzern, 2014 — Panama
 Ponsoonops hamus Bolzern, 2014 — Mexico, Belize, Guatemala
 Ponsoonops lavega Bolzern, 2014 — Hispaniola
 Ponsoonops lerida Bolzern, 2014 — Panama
 Ponsoonops lucha Bolzern, 2014 — Costa Rica
 Ponsoonops micans (Simon, 1893) — Venezuela
 Ponsoonops mirante Bolzern, 2014 — Panama
 Ponsoonops pansedro Bolzern, 2014 — Colombia
 Ponsoonops panto Bolzern, 2014 — Panama
 Ponsoonops salimsa Bolzern, 2014 — Panama
 Ponsoonops samadam Bolzern, 2014 — Costa Rica
 Ponsoonops sanvito Bolzern, 2014 (type) — Costa Rica
 Ponsoonops tacana Bolzern, 2014 — Mexico
 Ponsoonops viejo Bolzern, 2014 — Costa Rica
 Ponsoonops vuena Bolzern, 2014 — Panama
 Ponsoonops yumuri Bolzern, 2014 — Cuba

Predatoroonops

Predatoroonops Brescovit, Rheims & Ott, 2012
 Predatoroonops anna Brescovit, Rheims & Bonaldo, 2012 — Brazil
 Predatoroonops billy Brescovit, Rheims & Ott, 2012 — Brazil
 Predatoroonops blain Brescovit, Rheims & Ott, 2012 — Brazil
 Predatoroonops chicano Brescovit, Rheims & Santos, 2012 — Brazil
 Predatoroonops dillon Brescovit, Rheims & Bonaldo, 2012 — Brazil
 Predatoroonops dutch Brescovit, Rheims & Bonaldo, 2012 — Brazil
 Predatoroonops maceliot Brescovit, Rheims & Ott, 2012 — Brazil
 Predatoroonops mctiernani Brescovit, Rheims & Santos, 2012 — Brazil
 Predatoroonops olddemon Brescovit, Rheims & Santos, 2012 — Brazil
 Predatoroonops peterhalli Brescovit, Rheims & Santos, 2012 — Brazil
 Predatoroonops phillips Brescovit, Rheims & Santos, 2012 — Brazil
 Predatoroonops poncho Brescovit, Rheims & Ott, 2012 — Brazil
 Predatoroonops rickhawkins Brescovit, Rheims & Bonaldo, 2012 — Brazil
 Predatoroonops schwarzeneggeri Brescovit, Rheims & Ott, 2012 (type) — Brazil
 Predatoroonops vallarta Brescovit, Rheims & Bonaldo, 2012 — Brazil
 Predatoroonops valverde Brescovit, Rheims & Ott, 2012 — Brazil
 Predatoroonops yautja Brescovit, Rheims & Santos, 2012 — Brazil

Prethopalpus

Prethopalpus Baehr, Harvey, Burger & Thoma, 2012
 Prethopalpus alexanderi Baehr & Harvey, 2012 — Australia (Western Australia)
 Prethopalpus attenboroughi Baehr & Harvey, 2012 — Australia (Queensland)
 Prethopalpus bali Baehr, 2012 — Bali
 Prethopalpus bellicosus Baehr & Thoma, 2012 — Borneo
 Prethopalpus blosfeldsorum Baehr & Harvey, 2012 — Australia (Queensland)
 Prethopalpus boltoni Baehr & Harvey, 2012 — Australia (Western Australia)
 Prethopalpus brunei Baehr, 2012 — Borneo
 Prethopalpus callani Baehr & Harvey, 2012 — Australia (Western Australia)
 Prethopalpus cooperi Baehr & Harvey, 2012 — Australia (Western Australia)
 Prethopalpus deelemanae Baehr & Thoma, 2012 — Borneo
 Prethopalpus eberhardi Baehr & Harvey, 2012 — Australia (Western Australia)
 Prethopalpus fosuma (Burger, 2002) (type) — Indonesia (Java, Sumatra)
 Prethopalpus framenaui Baehr & Harvey, 2012 — Australia (Western Australia)
 Prethopalpus hainanensis Tong & Li, 2013 — China
 Prethopalpus humphreysi Baehr & Harvey, 2012 — Australia (Western Australia)
 Prethopalpus ilam Baehr, 2012 — Nepal
 Prethopalpus infernalis (Harvey & Edward, 2007) — Australia (Western Australia)
 Prethopalpus java Baehr, 2012 — Indonesia (Java)
 Prethopalpus julianneae Baehr & Harvey, 2012 — Australia (Western Australia)
 Prethopalpus khasi Baehr, 2012 — India
 Prethopalpus kintyre Baehr & Harvey, 2012 — Australia (Western Australia)
 Prethopalpus kranzae Baehr, 2012 — Indonesia (Sumatra)
 Prethopalpus kropfi Baehr, 2012 — Malaysia, Indonesia (Borneo)
 Prethopalpus leuser Baehr, 2012 — Indonesia (Sumatra)
 Prethopalpus madurai Baehr, 2012 — India
 Prethopalpus magnocularis Baehr & Thoma, 2012 — Borneo
 Prethopalpus mahanadi Baehr, 2012 — India
 Prethopalpus maini Baehr & Harvey, 2012 — Australia (Western Australia)
 Prethopalpus marionae Baehr & Harvey, 2012 — New Guinea, Australia (Queensland)
 Prethopalpus meghalaya Baehr, 2012 — India
 Prethopalpus oneillae Baehr & Harvey, 2012 — Australia (Western Australia)
 Prethopalpus pahang Baehr, 2012 — Malaysia, Singapore
 Prethopalpus pearsoni Baehr & Harvey, 2012 — Australia (Western Australia)
 Prethopalpus perak Baehr, 2012 — Malaysia
 Prethopalpus platnicki Baehr & Harvey, 2012 — Australia (Queensland)
 Prethopalpus rawlinsoni Baehr & Harvey, 2012 — Australia (Queensland)
 Prethopalpus sabah Baehr, 2012 — Borneo
 Prethopalpus sarawak Baehr, 2012 — Borneo
 Prethopalpus scanloni Baehr & Harvey, 2012 — Australia (Western Australia)
 Prethopalpus schwendingeri Baehr, 2012 — Singapore, Indonesia (Java, Sumatra)
 Prethopalpus tropicus Baehr & Harvey, 2012 — New Guinea, Australia (Queensland)
 Prethopalpus utara Baehr, 2012 — Indonesia (Sumatra)

Prida

Prida Saaristo, 2001
 Prida sechellensis (Benoit, 1979) (type) — Seychelles

Prodysderina

Prodysderina Platnick, Dupérré, Berniker & Bonaldo, 2013
 Prodysderina armata (Simon, 1893) (type) — Venezuela
 Prodysderina filandia Platnick, Dupérré, Berniker & Bonaldo, 2013 — Colombia
 Prodysderina janetae Platnick, Dupérré, Berniker & Bonaldo, 2013 — Venezuela
 Prodysderina megarmata Platnick, Dupérré, Berniker & Bonaldo, 2013 — Venezuela
 Prodysderina otun Platnick, Dupérré, Berniker & Bonaldo, 2013 — Colombia
 Prodysderina piedecuesta Platnick, Dupérré, Berniker & Bonaldo, 2013 — Colombia
 Prodysderina rasgon Platnick, Dupérré, Berniker & Bonaldo, 2013 — Colombia
 Prodysderina rollardae Platnick, Dupérré, Berniker & Bonaldo, 2013 — Venezuela
 Prodysderina santander Platnick, Dupérré, Berniker & Bonaldo, 2013 — Colombia

Pseudodysderina

Pseudodysderina Platnick, Berniker & Bonaldo, 2013
 Pseudodysderina beni Platnick, Berniker & Bonaldo, 2013 — Bolivia
 Pseudodysderina desultrix (Keyserling, 1881) (type) — Colombia, Ecuador, Peru, Brazil
 Pseudodysderina dracula Platnick, Berniker & Bonaldo, 2013 — Colombia
 Pseudodysderina hermani Platnick, Berniker & Bonaldo, 2013 — Ecuador
 Pseudodysderina manu Platnick, Berniker & Bonaldo, 2013 — Peru
 Pseudodysderina suiza Platnick, Berniker & Bonaldo, 2013 — Colombia
 Pseudodysderina utinga Platnick, Berniker & Bonaldo, 2013 — Brazil
 Pseudodysderina yungas Platnick, Berniker & Bonaldo, 2013 — Bolivia

Pseudoscaphiella

Pseudoscaphiella Simon, 1907
 Pseudoscaphiella parasita Simon, 1907 (type) — South Africa

Puan

Puan Izquierdo, 2012
 Puan chechehet Izquierdo, 2012 (type) — Argentina
 Puan nair Izquierdo, 2012 — Argentina

R

Reductoonops

Reductoonops Platnick & Berniker, 2014
 Reductoonops almirante Platnick & Berniker, 2014 — Panama
 Reductoonops armeria Platnick & Berniker, 2014 — Mexico
 Reductoonops bayano Platnick & Berniker, 2014 — Panama
 Reductoonops berun Dupérré & Tapia, 2017 — Ecuador
 Reductoonops carpish Platnick & Berniker, 2014 — Peru
 Reductoonops celica Platnick & Berniker, 2014 — Ecuador
 Reductoonops chamela Platnick & Berniker, 2014 — Mexico
 Reductoonops diamant Platnick & Berniker, 2014 — Martinique
 Reductoonops domingo Platnick & Berniker, 2014 — Ecuador
 Reductoonops elqui Platnick & Berniker, 2014 — Chile
 Reductoonops escopeta Platnick & Berniker, 2014 — Panama
 Reductoonops ferry Platnick & Berniker, 2014 — Jamaica
 Reductoonops hato Platnick & Berniker, 2014 — Curaçao
 Reductoonops hedlite Platnick & Berniker, 2014 — Ecuador
 Reductoonops jabin Platnick & Berniker, 2014 — Mexico
 Reductoonops jatun Platnick & Berniker, 2014 — Ecuador
 Reductoonops leticia Platnick & Berniker, 2014 — Colombia
 Reductoonops lucha Platnick & Berniker, 2014 — Costa Rica
 Reductoonops marta Platnick & Berniker, 2014 — Colombia
 Reductoonops meta Platnick & Berniker, 2014 — Colombia
 Reductoonops molleturo Platnick & Berniker, 2014 — Ecuador
 Reductoonops monte Platnick & Berniker, 2014 — Costa Rica
 Reductoonops naci Platnick & Berniker, 2014 — Costa Rica, Panama
 Reductoonops napo Platnick & Berniker, 2014 — Ecuador
 Reductoonops niltepec Platnick & Berniker, 2014 — Mexico
 Reductoonops nubes Platnick & Berniker, 2014 — Mexico
 Reductoonops otonga Platnick & Berniker, 2014 — Ecuador
 Reductoonops palenque Platnick & Berniker, 2014 — Ecuador
 Reductoonops pichincha Platnick & Berniker, 2014 — Ecuador
 Reductoonops pinta Platnick & Berniker, 2014 — Ecuador
 Reductoonops real Platnick & Berniker, 2014 — Mexico
 Reductoonops sasaima Platnick & Berniker, 2014 — Colombia
 Reductoonops tandapi Platnick & Berniker, 2014 — Ecuador
 Reductoonops tina Platnick & Berniker, 2014 — Ecuador
 Reductoonops yasuni Platnick & Berniker, 2014 (type) — Ecuador

S

Scaphidysderina

Scaphidysderina Platnick & Dupérré, 2011
 Scaphidysderina andersoni Platnick & Dupérré, 2011 — Ecuador
 Scaphidysderina baerti Platnick & Dupérré, 2011 — Ecuador
 Scaphidysderina cajamarca Platnick & Dupérré, 2011 — Peru
 Scaphidysderina chirin Dupérré & Tapia, 2017 — Ecuador
 Scaphidysderina cotopaxi Platnick & Dupérré, 2011 — Ecuador
 Scaphidysderina hormigai Platnick & Dupérré, 2011 — Colombia
 Scaphidysderina iguaque Platnick & Dupérré, 2011 — Colombia
 Scaphidysderina loja Platnick & Dupérré, 2011 — Ecuador
 Scaphidysderina lubanako Dupérré & Tapia, 2017 — Ecuador
 Scaphidysderina manu Platnick & Dupérré, 2011 — Peru
 Scaphidysderina molleturo Platnick & Dupérré, 2011 — Ecuador
 Scaphidysderina napo Platnick & Dupérré, 2011 — Ecuador
 Scaphidysderina pagoreni Platnick & Dupérré, 2011 — Peru
 Scaphidysderina palenque Platnick & Dupérré, 2011 — Ecuador *
 Scaphidysderina pinocchio Platnick & Dupérré, 2011 — Ecuador
 Scaphidysderina scutata Platnick & Dupérré, 2011 — Peru
 Scaphidysderina tandapi Platnick & Dupérré, 2011 — Ecuador
 Scaphidysderina tapiai Platnick & Dupérré, 2011 — Ecuador
 Scaphidysderina tayos Platnick & Dupérré, 2011 — Ecuador
 Scaphidysderina tsaran Dupérré & Tapia, 2017 — Ecuador

Scaphiella

Scaphiella Simon, 1892
 Scaphiella agocena Chickering, 1968 — Curaçao
 Scaphiella almirante Platnick & Dupérré, 2010 — Panama
 Scaphiella altamira Platnick & Dupérré, 2010 — Costa Rica, Panama
 Scaphiella antonio Platnick & Dupérré, 2010 — Costa Rica, Panama
 Scaphiella arima Platnick & Dupérré, 2010 — Trinidad
 Scaphiella ayacucho Platnick & Dupérré, 2010 — Venezuela
 Scaphiella barroana Gertsch, 1941 — Panama, Colombia
 Scaphiella bocas Platnick & Dupérré, 2010 — Panama
 Scaphiella bonda Platnick & Dupérré, 2010 — Colombia
 Scaphiella bopal Platnick & Dupérré, 2010 — Nicaragua
 Scaphiella bordoni Dumitrescu & Georgescu, 1987 — Venezuela
 Scaphiella bryantae Dumitrescu & Georgescu, 1983 — Cuba
 Scaphiella buck Platnick & Dupérré, 2010 — Virgin Is.
 Scaphiella campeche Platnick & Dupérré, 2010 — Mexico
 Scaphiella capim Platnick & Dupérré, 2010 — Brazil
 Scaphiella cata Platnick & Dupérré, 2010 — Venezuela
 Scaphiella cayo Platnick & Dupérré, 2010 — Belize
 Scaphiella ceiba Platnick & Dupérré, 2010 — Honduras
 Scaphiella chone Platnick & Dupérré, 2010 — Ecuador
 Scaphiella cocona Platnick & Dupérré, 2010 — Mexico
 Scaphiella curlena Chickering, 1968 — Jamaica
 Scaphiella cymbalaria Simon, 1892 (type) — Montserrat to St. Vincent
 Scaphiella etang Platnick & Dupérré, 2010 — Guadeloupe
 Scaphiella gracia Platnick & Dupérré, 2010 — Venezuela
 Scaphiella guatopo Platnick & Dupérré, 2010 — Venezuela
 Scaphiella guiria Platnick & Dupérré, 2010 — Venezuela, Trinidad
 Scaphiella hitoy Platnick & Dupérré, 2010 — Costa Rica
 Scaphiella hone Platnick & Dupérré, 2010 — Costa Rica, Panama
 Scaphiella icabaru Platnick & Dupérré, 2010 — Venezuela
 Scaphiella incha Platnick & Dupérré, 2010 — Ecuador
 Scaphiella irmaos Platnick & Dupérré, 2010 — Brazil
 Scaphiella kalunda Chickering, 1968 — Virgin Is.
 Scaphiella kartabo Platnick & Dupérré, 2010 — Guyana
 Scaphiella lancetilla Platnick & Dupérré, 2010 — Honduras
 Scaphiella longkey Platnick & Dupérré, 2010 — USA
 Scaphiella maculata Birabén, 1955 — Argentina
 Scaphiella manaus Platnick & Dupérré, 2010 — Brazil
 Scaphiella meta Platnick & Dupérré, 2010 — Colombia
 Scaphiella mico Platnick & Dupérré, 2010 — Guatemala
 Scaphiella miranda Platnick & Dupérré, 2010 — Venezuela
 Scaphiella muralla Platnick & Dupérré, 2010 — Honduras
 Scaphiella murici Platnick & Dupérré, 2010 — Brazil
 Scaphiella napo Platnick & Dupérré, 2010 — Ecuador
 Scaphiella osa Platnick & Dupérré, 2010 — Costa Rica
 Scaphiella pago Platnick & Dupérré, 2010 — Peru
 Scaphiella palenque Platnick & Dupérré, 2010 — Mexico
 Scaphiella palmillas Platnick & Dupérré, 2010 — Mexico
 Scaphiella penna Platnick & Dupérré, 2010 — Brazil
 Scaphiella pich Platnick & Dupérré, 2010 — Ecuador
 Scaphiella saba Platnick & Dupérré, 2010 — Saba
 Scaphiella scutiventris Simon, 1893 — Venezuela
 Scaphiella septella Chickering, 1968 — Virgin Is.
 Scaphiella simla Chickering, 1968 — Trinidad, Venezuela
 Scaphiella tena Platnick & Dupérré, 2010 — Ecuador
 Scaphiella tigre Platnick & Dupérré, 2010 — Venezuela
 Scaphiella tuxtla Platnick & Dupérré, 2010 — Mexico
 Scaphiella valencia Platnick & Dupérré, 2010 — Venezuela
 Scaphiella vicencio Platnick & Dupérré, 2010 — Colombia
 Scaphiella virgen Platnick & Dupérré, 2010 — Costa Rica
 Scaphiella vito Platnick & Dupérré, 2010 — Costa Rica
 Scaphiella weberi Chickering, 1968 — Trinidad
 Scaphiella williamsi Gertsch, 1941 — Panama

Scaphioides

Scaphioides Bryant, 1942
 Scaphioides bimini Platnick & Dupérré, 2012 — Bahama Is.
 Scaphioides camaguey Platnick & Dupérré, 2012 — Cuba
 Scaphioides campeche Platnick & Dupérré, 2012 — Mexico
 Scaphioides cletus (Chickering, 1969) — Jamaica
 Scaphioides cobre Platnick & Dupérré, 2012 — Cuba
 Scaphioides econotus (Chickering, 1969) — Puerto Rico
 Scaphioides gertschi Platnick & Dupérré, 2012 — Bahama Is.
 Scaphioides granpiedra Platnick & Dupérré, 2012 — Cuba
 Scaphioides halatus (Chickering, 1969) — Caribbean (Leeward Is.)
 Scaphioides hoffi (Chickering, 1969) — Jamaica
 Scaphioides irazu Platnick & Dupérré, 2012 — Costa Rica
 Scaphioides miches Platnick & Dupérré, 2012 — Hispaniola
 Scaphioides minuta (Chamberlin & Ivie, 1935) — USA
 Scaphioides nitens (Bryant, 1942) — Virgin Is.
 Scaphioides phonetus (Chickering, 1969) — Puerto Rico
 Scaphioides reducta Bryant, 1942 (type) — Virgin Is.
 Scaphioides reductoides Platnick & Dupérré, 2012 — Virgin Is.
 Scaphioides siboney Platnick & Dupérré, 2012 — Cuba
 Scaphioides yateras Platnick & Dupérré, 2012 — Cuba

Scaphios

Scaphios Platnick & Dupérré, 2010
 Scaphios cayambe Platnick & Dupérré, 2010 — Ecuador
 Scaphios jatun Platnick & Dupérré, 2010 — Ecuador
 Scaphios napo Platnick & Dupérré, 2010 — Ecuador
 Scaphios orellana Platnick & Dupérré, 2010 — Ecuador
 Scaphios planada Platnick & Dupérré, 2010 — Colombia
 Scaphios puyo Platnick & Dupérré, 2010 — Ecuador
 Scaphios wagra Platnick & Dupérré, 2010 — Ecuador
 Scaphios yanayacu Platnick & Dupérré, 2010 (type) — Ecuador

Semibulbus

Semibulbus Saaristo, 2007
 Semibulbus zekharya Saaristo, 2007 (type) — Israel

Semidysderina

Semidysderina Platnick & Dupérré, 2011
 Semidysderina donachui Platnick & Dupérré, 2011 — Colombia
 Semidysderina kochalkai Platnick & Dupérré, 2011 — Colombia
 Semidysderina lagila Platnick & Dupérré, 2011 (type) — Colombia
 Semidysderina marta Platnick & Dupérré, 2011 — Colombia
 Semidysderina mulleri Platnick & Dupérré, 2011 — Colombia
 Semidysderina sturmi Platnick & Dupérré, 2011 — Colombia

Setayeshoonops

Setayeshoonops Makhan & Ezzatpanah, 2011
 Setayeshoonops setayeshoonops Makhan & Ezzatpanah, 2011 (type) — Suriname

Sicariomorpha

Sicariomorpha Ott & Harvey, 2015
 Sicariomorpha maschwitzi (Wunderlich, 1995) (type) — Malaysia

Silhouettella

Silhouettella Benoit, 1979
 Silhouettella betalfa Saaristo, 2007 — Israel
 Silhouettella curieusei Benoit, 1979 (type) — Seychelles, Madagascar
 Silhouettella loricatula (Roewer, 1942) — Europe to Central Asia, North Africa, Canary Is.
 Silhouettella osmaniye Wunderlich, 2011 — Turkey, Azerbaijan
 Silhouettella perisalma Álvarez-Padilla, Ubick & Griswold, 2015 — Madagascar
 Silhouettella perismontes Álvarez-Padilla, Ubick & Griswold, 2015 — Madagascar
 Silhouettella saaristoi Ranasinghe & Benjamin, 2018 — Sri Lanka
 Silhouettella snippy Ranasinghe & Benjamin, 2018 — Sri Lanka
 Silhouettella tiggy Ranasinghe & Benjamin, 2018 — Sri Lanka
 Silhouettella tomer Saaristo, 2007 — Israel
 Silhouettella usgutra Saaristo & van Harten, 2002 — Yemen (Socotra)

Simlops

Simlops Bonaldo, Ott & Ruiz, 2014
 Simlops bandeirante Ott, 2014 — Brazil
 Simlops bodanus (Chickering, 1968) — Trinidad
 Simlops cachorro Ruiz, 2014 — Colombia
 Simlops campinarana Brescovit, 2014 — Brazil
 Simlops cristinae Santos, 2014 — Brazil
 Simlops guatopo Brescovit, 2014 — Venezuela
 Simlops guyanensis Santos, 2014 — Guyana
 Simlops jamesbondi Bonaldo, 2014 — Brazil
 Simlops juruti Bonaldo, 2014 — Brazil
 Simlops kartabo Feitosa & Bonaldo, 2017 — Guyana
 Simlops machadoi Ott, 2014 — Brazil
 Simlops miudo Ruiz, 2014 — Brazil
 Simlops nadinae Ruiz, 2014 — Brazil
 Simlops pennai Bonaldo, 2014 (type) — Brazil
 Simlops platnicki Bonaldo, 2014 — Brazil
 Simlops similis Ott, 2014 — Brazil

Simonoonops

Simonoonops Harvey, 2002
 Simonoonops andersoni Platnick & Dupérré, 2011 — Venezuela
 Simonoonops chickeringi Platnick & Dupérré, 2011 — St. Vincent
 Simonoonops craneae (Chickering, 1968) (type) — Venezuela, Trinidad
 Simonoonops etang Platnick & Dupérré, 2011 — Grenada
 Simonoonops globina (Chickering, 1968) — Dominican Rep.
 Simonoonops grande Platnick & Dupérré, 2011 — Venezuela
 Simonoonops lutzi Platnick & Dupérré, 2011 — Guyana
 Simonoonops princeps (Simon, 1892) — St. Vincent
 Simonoonops simoni Platnick & Dupérré, 2011 — Venezuela
 Simonoonops soltina (Chickering, 1968) — St. Vincent
 Simonoonops spiniger Simon, 1892 — St. Vincent

Socotroonops

Socotroonops Saaristo & van Harten, 2002
 Socotroonops socotra Saaristo & van Harten, 2002 (type) — Yemen (Socotra)

Spinestis

Spinestis Saaristo & Marusik, 2009
 Spinestis nikita Saaristo & Marusik, 2009 (type) — Ukraine

Stenoonops

Stenoonops Simon, 1892
 Stenoonops alazan Platnick & Dupérré, 2010 — Mexico
 Stenoonops belmopan Platnick & Dupérré, 2010 — Belize
 Stenoonops bimini Platnick & Dupérré, 2010 — Bahama Is.
 Stenoonops brendae Platnick, Dupérré & Berniker, 2013 — Cuba
 Stenoonops cabo Platnick & Dupérré, 2010 — Mexico
 Stenoonops canita Platnick & Dupérré, 2010 — Panama
 Stenoonops dimotus Chickering, 1969 — Jamaica
 Stenoonops egenulus Simon, 1893 — Venezuela
 Stenoonops exgord Platnick & Dupérré, 2010 — Virgin Is.
 Stenoonops insolitus Chickering, 1969 — Jamaica
 Stenoonops jara Platnick & Dupérré, 2010 — Hispaniola
 Stenoonops kochalkai Platnick & Dupérré, 2010 — Colombia
 Stenoonops luquillo Platnick & Dupérré, 2010 — Puerto Rico
 Stenoonops macabus Chickering, 1969 — Jamaica
 Stenoonops mandeville Platnick & Dupérré, 2010 — Jamaica
 Stenoonops murphyorum Platnick & Dupérré, 2010 — Costa Rica
 Stenoonops opisthornatus Benoit, 1979 — Seychelles
 Stenoonops peckorum Platnick & Dupérré, 2010 — USA
 Stenoonops petrunkevitchi Chickering, 1951 — Costa Rica, Panama
 Stenoonops pretiosus (Bryant, 1942) — Virgin Is.
 Stenoonops saba Platnick & Dupérré, 2010 — Saba
 Stenoonops saintjohn Platnick & Dupérré, 2010 — Virgin Is.
 Stenoonops scabriculus Simon, 1892 (type) — Guadeloupe, St. Vincent, Venezuela
 Stenoonops schuhi Platnick, Dupérré & Berniker, 2013 — Cuba
 Stenoonops simla Platnick & Dupérré, 2010 — Trinidad
 Stenoonops tayrona Platnick & Dupérré, 2010 — Colombia, Venezuela
 Stenoonops tobyi Platnick, Dupérré & Berniker, 2013 — Cuba
 Stenoonops tortola Platnick & Dupérré, 2010 — Virgin Is.

Sulsula

Sulsula Simon, 1882
 Sulsula pauper (O. Pickard-Cambridge, 1876) (type) — Algeria, Egypt, Sudan

T

Tapinesthis

Tapinesthis Simon, 1914
 Tapinesthis inermis (Simon, 1882) (type) — Europe

Telchius

Telchius Simon, 1893
 Telchius barbarus Simon, 1893 (type) — Algeria
 Telchius maculosus Denis, 1952 — Morocco
 Telchius transvaalicus Simon, 1907 — South Africa

Termitoonops

Termitoonops Benoit, 1964
 Termitoonops apicarquieri Benoit, 1975 — Congo
 Termitoonops bouilloni Benoit, 1964 (type) — Congo
 Termitoonops faini Benoit, 1964 — Congo
 Termitoonops furculitermitis Benoit, 1975 — Congo
 Termitoonops spinosissimus Benoit, 1964 — Congo

Tinadysderina

Tinadysderina Platnick, Berniker & Bonaldo, 2013
 Tinadysderina bremen Platnick, Berniker & Bonaldo, 2013 — Colombia
 Tinadysderina gorgona Platnick, Berniker & Bonaldo, 2013 — Colombia
 Tinadysderina otonga Platnick, Berniker & Bonaldo, 2013 — Ecuador
 Tinadysderina pereira Platnick, Berniker & Bonaldo, 2013 — Colombia
 Tinadysderina planada Platnick, Berniker & Bonaldo, 2013 — Colombia
 Tinadysderina tinalandia Platnick, Berniker & Bonaldo, 2013 (type) — Ecuador

Tolegnaro

Tolegnaro Álvarez-Padilla, Ubick & Griswold, 2012
 Tolegnaro kepleri Álvarez-Padilla, Ubick & Griswold, 2012 — Madagascar
 Tolegnaro sagani Álvarez-Padilla, Ubick & Griswold, 2012 — Madagascar

Toloonops

Toloonops Bolzern, Platnick & Berniker, 2015
 Toloonops belmo Bolzern, Platnick & Berniker, 2015 — Belize
 Toloonops chiapa Bolzern, Platnick & Berniker, 2015 (type) — Mexico
 Toloonops chickeringi (Brignoli, 1974) — Mexico
 Toloonops jacala Bolzern, Platnick & Berniker, 2015 — Mexico
 Toloonops tolucanus (Gertsch & Davis, 1942) — Mexico
 Toloonops veracruz Bolzern, Platnick & Berniker, 2015 — Mexico
 Toloonops verapaz Bolzern, Platnick & Berniker, 2015 — Guatemala

Triaeris

Triaeris Simon, 1892
 Triaeris barela Gajbe, 2004 — India
 Triaeris equestris Simon, 1907 — São Tomé and Príncipe
 Triaeris fako Platnick, Dupérré, Ubick & Fannes, 2012 — Cameroon
 Triaeris ibadan Platnick, Dupérré, Ubick & Fannes, 2012 — Nigeria
 Triaeris khashiensis Tikader, 1966 — India
 Triaeris macrophthalmus Berland, 1914 — Kenya
 Triaeris macrophthalmus cryptops Berland, 1914 — Kenya, Zanzibar
 Triaeris macrophthalmus medius Berland, 1914 — Kenya
 Triaeris manii Tikader & Malhotra, 1974 — India
 Triaeris melghaticus Bastawade, 2005 — India
 Triaeris menchum Platnick, Dupérré, Ubick & Fannes, 2012 — Cameroon
 Triaeris moca Platnick, Dupérré, Ubick & Fannes, 2012 — Equatorial Guinea (Bioko)
 Triaeris nagarensis Tikader & Malhotra, 1974 — India
 Triaeris nagpurensis Tikader & Malhotra, 1974 — India
 Triaeris oku Platnick, Dupérré, Ubick & Fannes, 2012 — Cameroon
 Triaeris poonaensis Tikader & Malhotra, 1974 — India
 Triaeris stenaspis Simon, 1892 (type) — Africa. Introduced to North, Central, South America, Caribbean, Europe, Iran, Taiwan, Australia, Pacific Is.
 Triaeris togo Platnick, Dupérré, Ubick & Fannes, 2012 — Togo

Tridysderina

Tridysderina Platnick, Berniker & Bonaldo, 2013
 Tridysderina archidona Platnick, Berniker & Bonaldo, 2013 — Ecuador
 Tridysderina bellavista Platnick, Berniker & Bonaldo, 2013 — Ecuador
 Tridysderina galeras Platnick, Berniker & Bonaldo, 2013 — Ecuador
 Tridysderina jatun Platnick, Berniker & Bonaldo, 2013 — Ecuador
 Tridysderina tena Platnick, Berniker & Bonaldo, 2013 — Ecuador
 Tridysderina yasuni Platnick, Berniker & Bonaldo, 2013 (type) — Ecuador

Trilacuna

Trilacuna Tong & Li, 2007
 Trilacuna aenobarba (Brignoli, 1978) — Bhutan
 Trilacuna alces Eichenberger, 2011 — Thailand
 Trilacuna angularis Tong & Li, 2007 — China
 Trilacuna bangla Grismado & Ramírez, 2014 — India, Nepal
 Trilacuna bawan Tong, Zhang & Li, 2019 — China
 Trilacuna besucheti Grismado & Piacentini, 2014 — India
 Trilacuna bilingua Eichenberger, 2011 — Malaysia
 Trilacuna clarissa Eichenberger, 2011 — Indonesia (Sumatra)
 Trilacuna datang Tong, Zhang & Li, 2019 — China
 Trilacuna diabolica Kranz-Baltensperger, 2011 — Thailand
 Trilacuna fugong Tong, Zhang & Li, 2019 — China
 Trilacuna gongshan Tong, Zhang & Li, 2019 — China
 Trilacuna hamata Tong & Li, 2013 — Vietnam
 Trilacuna hansanensis Seo, 2017 — Korea
 Trilacuna hazara Grismado & Ramírez, 2014 — Pakistan
 Trilacuna kropfi Eichenberger, 2011 — Thailand
 Trilacuna loebli Grismado & Piacentini, 2014 — India
 Trilacuna longling Tong, Zhang & Li, 2019 — China
 Trilacuna mahanadi Grismado & Piacentini, 2014 — India
 Trilacuna meghalaya Grismado & Piacentini, 2014 — India
 Trilacuna merapi Kranz-Baltensperger & Eichenberger, 2011 — Indonesia (Sumatra)
 Trilacuna qarzi Malek Hosseini & Grismado, 2015 — Iran
 Trilacuna rastrum Tong & Li, 2007 (type) — China
 Trilacuna simianshan Tong & Li, 2018 — China
 Trilacuna sinuosa Tong & Li, 2013 — Vietnam
 Trilacuna songyuae Tong & Li, 2018 — China
 Trilacuna werni Eichenberger, 2011 — Thailand
 Trilacuna wuhe Tong, Zhang & Li, 2019 — China
 Trilacuna xinping Tong, Zhang & Li, 2019 — China

U

Unicorn

Unicorn Platnick & Brescovit, 1995
 Unicorn argentina (Mello-Leitão, 1940) — Argentina
 Unicorn catleyi Platnick & Brescovit, 1995 (type) — Chile, Argentina
 Unicorn chacabuco Platnick & Brescovit, 1995 — Chile
 Unicorn huanaco Platnick & Brescovit, 1995 — Bolivia
 Unicorn sikus González, Corronca & Cava, 2010 — Argentina
 Unicorn socos Platnick & Brescovit, 1995 — Chile
 Unicorn toconao Platnick & Brescovit, 1995 — Chile

V

Varioonops

Varioonops Bolzern & Platnick, 2013
 Varioonops cafista Bolzern & Platnick, 2013 (type) — Costa Rica
 Varioonops cerrado Bolzern & Platnick, 2013 — Panama
 Varioonops chordio Bolzern & Platnick, 2013 — Venezuela
 Varioonops edvardi Bolzern & Platnick, 2013 — Colombia
 Varioonops funator Bolzern & Platnick, 2013 — Panama
 Varioonops girven Bolzern & Platnick, 2013 — Costa Rica
 Varioonops grancho Bolzern & Platnick, 2013 — Venezuela
 Varioonops heredia Bolzern & Platnick, 2013 — Costa Rica
 Varioonops montesta Bolzern & Platnick, 2013 — Costa Rica
 Varioonops parlata Bolzern & Platnick, 2013 — Venezuela
 Varioonops pittieri Bolzern & Platnick, 2013 — Venezuela
 Varioonops poas Bolzern & Platnick, 2013 — Costa Rica
 Varioonops potaguo Bolzern & Platnick, 2013 — Venezuela
 Varioonops ramila Bolzern & Platnick, 2013 — Costa Rica, Panama
 Varioonops sansidro Bolzern & Platnick, 2013 — Costa Rica, Panama
 Varioonops sinesama Bolzern & Platnick, 2013 — Colombia
 Varioonops spatharum Bolzern & Platnick, 2013 — Costa Rica
 Varioonops tortuguero Bolzern & Platnick, 2013 — Costa Rica
 Varioonops trujillo Bolzern & Platnick, 2013 — Venezuela
 Varioonops varablanca Bolzern & Platnick, 2013 — Costa Rica
 Varioonops velsala Bolzern & Platnick, 2013 — Costa Rica
 Varioonops veragua Bolzern & Platnick, 2013 — Costa Rica
 Varioonops yacambu Bolzern & Platnick, 2013 — Venezuela

Vientianea

Vientianea Tong & Li, 2013
 Vientianea peterjaegeri Tong & Li, 2013 (type) — Laos

Volborattella

Volborattella Saucedo & Ubick, 2015
 Volborattella guenevera Saucedo, Ubick & Griswold, 2015 — Madagascar
 Volborattella nasario Saucedo, Ubick & Griswold, 2015 — Madagascar
 Volborattella paulyi Saucedo, Ubick & Griswold, 2015 — Madagascar
 Volborattella teresae Saucedo, Ubick & Griswold, 2015 (type) — Madagascar
 Volborattella toliara Saucedo, Ubick & Griswold, 2015 — Madagascar

W

Wanops

Wanops Chamberlin & Ivie, 1938
 Wanops coecus Chamberlin & Ivie, 1938 (type) — Mexico

X

Xestaspis

Xestaspis Simon, 1884
 Xestaspis biflocci Eichenberger, 2012 — Thailand
 Xestaspis kandy Eichenberger, 2012 — Sri Lanka
 Xestaspis linnaei Ott & Harvey, 2008 — Australia (Western Australia)
 Xestaspis loricata (L. Koch, 1873) (type) — China, Taiwan, Laos, Australia, Micronesia, French Polynesia
 Xestaspis nitida Simon, 1884 — Algeria, Yemen
 Xestaspis nuwaraeliya Ranasinghe & Benjamin, 2016 — Sri Lanka
 Xestaspis padaviya Ranasinghe & Benjamin, 2016 — Sri Lanka
 Xestaspis parmata (Thorell, 1890) — Myanmar, Indonesia (Sumatra, Java, Lombok). Introduced to USA to Panama, Caribbean, Venezuela, Brazil, Madeira, Equatorial Guinea (Bioko), São Tomé and Príncipe, St. Helena, Mauritius, Seychelles, Yemen
 Xestaspis paulina Eichenberger, 2012 — Sri Lanka
 Xestaspis pophami Ranasinghe & Benjamin, 2016 — Sri Lanka
 Xestaspis recurva Strand, 1906 — Ethiopia
 Xestaspis rostrata Tong & Li, 2009 — China
 Xestaspis semengoh Eichenberger, 2012 — Borneo
 Xestaspis sertata Simon, 1907 — Equatorial Guinea (Bioko)
 Xestaspis shoushanensis Tong & Li, 2014 — Taiwan
 Xestaspis sis Saaristo & van Harten, 2006 — Yemen
 Xestaspis sublaevis Simon, 1893 — Sri Lanka
 Xestaspis tumidula Simon, 1893 — Sierra Leone
 Xestaspis yemeni Saaristo & van Harten, 2006 — Yemen

Xiombarg

Xiombarg Brignoli, 1979
 Xiombarg plaumanni Brignoli, 1979 (type) — Brazil, Argentina

Xyccarph

Xyccarph Brignoli, 1978
 Xyccarph migrans Höfer & Brescovit, 1996 — Brazil
 Xyccarph myops Brignoli, 1978 (type) — Brazil
 Xyccarph tenuis (Vellard, 1924) — Brazil
 Xyccarph wellingtoni Höfer & Brescovit, 1996 — Brazil

Xyphinus

Xyphinus Simon, 1893
 Xyphinus abanghamidi Deeleman-Reinhold, 1987 — Borneo
 Xyphinus acutus Kranz-Baltensperger, 2014 — Borneo
 Xyphinus baehrae Kranz-Baltensperger, 2014 — India to Australia
 Xyphinus deelemanae Kranz-Baltensperger, 2014 — Borneo
 Xyphinus distortus Kranz-Baltensperger, 2014 — Thailand, Malaysia
 Xyphinus gibber Deeleman-Reinhold, 1987 — Borneo
 Xyphinus holgeri Kranz-Baltensperger, 2014 — Thailand, Laos, Malaysia, Indonesia (Borneo), Brunei
 Xyphinus hwangi Tong & Li, 2014 — Taiwan
 Xyphinus hystrix Simon, 1893 (type) — Malaysia, Singapore
 Xyphinus infaustus Kranz-Baltensperger, 2014 — Indonesia (Sumatra)
 Xyphinus karschi (Bösenberg & Strand, 1906) — China, Thailand, Taiwan, Japan
 Xyphinus krabi Kranz-Baltensperger, 2014 — Thailand
 Xyphinus lemniscatus Deeleman-Reinhold, 1987 — Borneo
 Xyphinus montanus Deeleman-Reinhold, 1987 — Borneo
 Xyphinus pachara Kranz-Baltensperger, 2014 — Malaysia
 Xyphinus pakse Tong & Li, 2013 — Laos
 Xyphinus rogerfedereri Kranz-Baltensperger, 2014 — Malaysia, Thailand
 Xyphinus sabal Kranz-Baltensperger, 2014 — Borneo
 Xyphinus xanthus Deeleman-Reinhold, 1987 — Borneo
 Xyphinus xelo Deeleman-Reinhold, 1987 — Malaysia

Y

Yumates

Yumates Chamberlin, 1924
 Yumates angela Chamberlin, 1924 — Mexico
 Yumates nesophila Chamberlin, 1924 (type) — Mexico

Z

Zyngoonops

Zyngoonops Benoit, 1977
 Zyngoonops beatriceae Fannes, 2013 — Congo
 Zyngoonops chambersi Fannes, 2013 — Congo
 Zyngoonops clandestinus Benoit, 1977 (type) — Congo
 Zyngoonops goedaerti Fannes, 2013 — Congo
 Zyngoonops marki Fannes, 2013 — Congo
 Zyngoonops moffetti Fannes, 2013 — Congo
 Zyngoonops redii Fannes, 2013 — Congo
 Zyngoonops rockoxi Fannes, 2013 — Congo
 Zyngoonops swammerdami Fannes, 2013 — Congo
 Zyngoonops walcotti Fannes, 2013 — Central African Rep.

References

Oonopidae
Oonopidae